Brazil has one of the richest bird diversities in the world. The avifauna of Brazil include a total of 1858 confirmed species of which 238 are endemic. Five have been introduced by humans, 96 are rare or vagrants, and five are extinct or extirpated. An additional 14 species are hypothetical (see below).

Brazil hosts about 60% of the bird species recorded for all of South America. These numbers are still increasing almost every year, due to new occurrences, new species being described, or splits of existing species. About 10% of the bird species found in Brazil are, nonetheless, threatened.

In June 2013 a simultaneous discovery of fifteen bird species in Brazil was announced, the first such since 1871, when August von Pelzeln described forty new species. The birds were from the families Corvidae, Thamnophilidae, Dendrocolaptidae, Tyrannidae, and Polioptilidae. Eleven of the new species are endemics of Brazil and four also inhabit Peru and Bolivia.

Except as an entry is cited otherwise, the list of species is that of the South American Classification Committee (SACC) of the American Ornithological Society. The list's taxonomic treatment (designation and sequence of orders, families, and species) and nomenclature (common and scientific names) are also those of the SACC. Two additional species are added from other sources and are not included in the above counts.

The notes of population status, for instance (endangered), are those of the International Union for Conservation of Nature (IUCN) Red List. The status notes apply to the worldwide population, not solely the Brazilian population except for endemic species.

The following tags have been used to highlight several categories of occurrence.

 (V) Vagrant - a species that rarely or accidentally occurs in Brazil
 (E) Endemic - a species endemic to Brazil
 (I) Introduced - a species introduced to Brazil as a consequence, direct or indirect, of human actions
 (H) Hypothetical - a species recorded but with "no tangible evidence" according to the SACC

Rheas

Order: RheiformesFamily: Rheidae

The rheas are large flightless birds native to South America. Their feet have three toes rather than four which allows them to run faster.
 
 Greater rhea, Rhea americana (near-threatened)

Tinamous
Order: TinamiformesFamily: Tinamidae

The tinamous are one of the most ancient groups of bird. Although they look similar to other ground-dwelling birds like quail and grouse, they have no close relatives and are classified as a single family, Tinamidae, within their own order, the Tinamiformes. They are distantly related to the ratites (order Struthioniformes), which includes the rheas, emus, and kiwis.

 Gray tinamou, Tinamus tao
 Solitary tinamou, Tinamus solitarius (near-threatened)
 Great tinamou, Tinamus major
 White-throated tinamou, Tinamus guttatus
 Cinereous tinamou, Crypturellus cinereus
 Little tinamou, Crypturellus soui
 Brown tinamou, Crypturellus obsoletus
 Undulated tinamou, Crypturellus undulatus
 Brazilian tinamou, Crypturellus strigulosus
 Gray-legged tinamou, Crypturellus duidae
 Red-legged tinamou, Crypturellus erythropus
 Yellow-legged tinamou, Crypturellus noctivagus (E) (near-threatened)
 Black-capped tinamou, Crypturellus atrocapillus
 Variegated tinamou, Crypturellus variegatus
 Rusty tinamou, Crypturellus brevirostris
 Bartlett's tinamou, Crypturellus bartletti
 Small-billed tinamou, Crypturellus parvirostris
 Tataupa tinamou, Crypturellus tataupa
 Red-winged tinamou, Rhynchotus rufescens
 White-bellied nothura, Nothura boraquira
 Lesser nothura, Nothura minor (vulnerable)
 Spotted nothura, Nothura maculosa
 Dwarf tinamou, Taoniscus nanus (vulnerable)

Screamers

Order: AnseriformesFamily: Anhimidae

The screamers are a small family of birds related to the ducks. They are large, bulky birds, with a small downy head, long legs, and large feet which are only partially webbed. They have large spurs on their wings which are used in fights over mates and in territorial disputes.

 Horned screamer, Anhima cornuta
 Southern screamer, Chauna torquata

Ducks

Order: AnseriformesFamily: Anatidae

Anatidae includes the ducks and most duck-like waterfowl, such as geese and swans. These birds are adapted to an aquatic existence with webbed feet, flattened bills, and feathers that are excellent at shedding water due to an oily coating.

 Fulvous whistling-duck, Dendrocygna bicolor
 White-faced whistling-duck, Dendrocygna viduata
 Black-bellied whistling-duck, Dendrocygna autumnalis
 Black-necked swan, Cygnus melancoryphus
 Coscoroba swan, Coscoroba coscoroba
 Orinoco goose, Oressochen jubatus (near-threatened)
 Upland goose, Chloephaga pictus (V)
 Muscovy duck, Cairina moschata
 Comb duck, Sarkidiornis sylvicola
 Ringed teal, Callonetta leucophrys
 Brazilian teal, Amazonetta brasiliensis
 Silver teal, Spatula versicolor
 Red shoveler, Spatula platalea
 Blue-winged teal, Spatula discors (V)
 Cinnamon teal, Spatula cyanoptera (V)
 Chiloe wigeon, Mareca sibilatrix
 White-cheeked pintail, Anas bahamensis
 Northern pintail, Anas acuta (V)
 Yellow-billed pintail, Anas georgica
 Yellow-billed teal, Anas flavirostris
 Southern pochard, Netta erythrophthalma
 Rosy-billed pochard, Netta peposaca
 Brazilian merganser, Mergus octosetaceus (critically endangered)
 Black-headed duck, Heteronetta atricapilla
 Masked duck, Nomonyx dominicus
 Lake duck, Oxyura vittata

Guans
Order: GalliformesFamily: Cracidae

The Cracidae are large birds, similar in general appearance to turkeys. The guans and curassows live in trees, but the smaller chachalacas are found in more open scrubby habitats. They are generally dull-plumaged, but the curassows and some guans have colorful facial ornaments.

 Marail guan, Penelope marail
 Rusty-margined guan, Penelope superciliaris
 Spix's guan, Penelope jacquacu
 Dusky-legged guan, Penelope obscura
 White-crested guan, Penelope pileata (E) (vulnerable)
 Chestnut-bellied guan, Penelope ochrogaster (E) (vulnerable)
 White-browed guan, Penelope jacucaca (E) (vulnerable)
 Blue-throated piping-guan, Pipile cumanensis
 Red-throated piping-guan, Pipile cujubi
 Black-fronted piping-guan, Pipile jacutinga (vulnerable)
 Chaco chachalaca, Ortalis canicollis
 Speckled chachalaca, Ortalis guttata
 East Brazilian chachalaca, Ortalis araucuan (E)
 Scaled chachalaca, Ortalis squamata (E)
 Variable chachalaca, Ortalis motmot
 Chestnut-headed chachalaca, Ortalis ruficeps (E)
 Buff-browed chachalaca, Ortalis superciliaris (E)
 Nocturnal curassow, Nothocrax urumutum
 Black curassow, Crax alector
 Wattled curassow, Crax globulosa (vulnerable)
 Bare-faced curassow, Crax fasciolata
 Red-billed curassow, Crax blumenbachii (E) (endangered)
 Crestless curassow, Mitu tomentosum
 Razor-billed curassow, Mitu tuberosum
 Alagoas curassow, Mitu mitu (E) (extinct in the wild)

New World quails
Order: GalliformesFamily: Odontophoridae

The New World quails are small, plump terrestrial birds only distantly related to the quails of the Old World, but named for their similar appearance and habits.

 Crested bobwhite, Colinus cristatus
 Marbled wood-quail, Odontophorus gujanensis
 Spot-winged wood-quail, Odontophorus capueira
 Starred wood-quail, Odontophorus stellatus

Flamingos

Order: PhoenicopteriformesFamily: Phoenicopteridae

Flamingos filter-feed on shellfish and algae. Their oddly shaped beaks are specially adapted to separate mud and silt from the food they consume and, uniquely, are used upside-down.

 Chilean flamingo, Phoenicopterus chilensis (near-threatened)
 American flamingo, Phoenicopterus ruber
 Andean flamingo, Phoenicoparrus andinus (V)
 James's flamingo, Phoenicoparrus jamesi (V)

Grebes

Order: PodicipediformesFamily: Podicipedidae

Grebes are small to medium-large freshwater diving birds. They have lobed toes and are excellent swimmers and divers. However, they have their feet placed far back on the body, making them quite ungainly on land.

 White-tufted grebe, Rollandia rolland
 Least grebe, Tachybaptus dominicus
 Pied-billed grebe, Podilymbus podiceps
 Great grebe, Podiceps major
 Silvery grebe, Podiceps occipitalis

Pigeons

Order: ColumbiformesFamily: Columbidae

Pigeons and doves are stout-bodied birds with short necks and short slender bills with a fleshy cere.

 Rock pigeon, Columba livia (I)
 Scaled pigeon, Patagioenas speciosa
 Picazuro pigeon, Patagioenas picazuro
 Spot-winged pigeon, Patagioenas maculosa
 Band-tailed pigeon, Patagioenas fasciata
 Pale-vented pigeon, Patagioenas cayennensis
 Plumbeous pigeon, Patagioenas plumbea
 Ruddy pigeon, Patagioenas subvinacea
 Sapphire quail-dove, Geotrygon saphirina
 Ruddy quail-dove, Geotrygon montana
 Violaceous quail-dove, Geotrygon violacea
 White-tipped dove, Leptotila verreauxi
 Gray-fronted dove, Leptotila rufaxilla
 Eared dove, Zenaida auriculata
 Blue ground dove, Claravis pretiosa
 Long-tailed ground dove, Uropelia campestris
 Purple-winged ground dove, Paraclaravis geoffroyi (critically endangered)
 Common ground dove, Columbina passerina
 Plain-breasted ground dove, Columbina minuta
 Ruddy ground dove, Columbina talpacoti
 Scaled dove, Columbina squammata
 Picui ground dove, Columbina picui
 Blue-eyed ground dove, Columbina cyanopis (E) (critically endangered)

Cuckoos

Order: CuculiformesFamily: Cuculidae

The family Cuculidae includes cuckoos, roadrunners, and anis. These birds are of variable size with slender bodies, long tails and strong legs.

 Guira cuckoo, Guira guira
 Greater ani, Crotophaga major
 Smooth-billed ani, Crotophaga ani
 Striped cuckoo, Tapera naevia
 Pheasant cuckoo, Dromococcyx phasianellus
 Pavonine cuckoo, Dromococcyx pavoninus
 Rufous-vented ground-cuckoo, Neomorphus geoffroyi
 Scaled ground-cuckoo, Neomorphus squamiger (E) (vulnerable)
 Rufous-winged ground-cuckoo, Neomorphus rufipennis
 Red-billed ground-cuckoo, Neomorphus pucheranii
 Little cuckoo, Coccycua minuta
 Dwarf cuckoo, Coccycua pumila (H)
 Ash-colored cuckoo, Coccycua cinerea
 Squirrel cuckoo, Piaya cayana
 Black-bellied cuckoo, Piaya melanogaster
 Dark-billed cuckoo, Coccyzus melacoryphus
 Yellow-billed cuckoo, Coccyzus americanus
 Pearly-breasted cuckoo, Coccyzus euleri
 Mangrove cuckoo, Coccyzus minor
 Black-billed cuckoo, Coccyzus erythropthalmus (V)
 Common cuckoo, Cuculus canorus (V)

Oilbird
Order: SteatornithiformesFamily: Steatornithidae

The oilbird is a slim, long-winged bird related to the nightjars. It is nocturnal and a specialist feeder on the fruit of the oil palm.

 Oilbird, Steatornis caripensis

Potoos

Order: NyctibiiformesFamily: Nyctibiidae

The potoos (sometimes called poor-me-ones) are large near passerine birds related to the nightjars and frogmouths. They are nocturnal insectivores which lack the bristles around the mouth found in the true nightjars.

 Rufous potoo, Phyllaemulor bracteatus
 Great potoo, Nyctibius grandis
 Long-tailed potoo, Nyctibius aethereus
 Common potoo, Nyctibius griseus
 White-winged potoo, Nyctibius leucopterus

Nightjars

Order: CaprimulgiformesFamily: Caprimulgidae

Nightjars are medium-sized nocturnal birds that usually nest on the ground. They have long wings, short legs, and very short bills. Most have small feet, of little use for walking, and long pointed wings. Their soft plumage is camouflaged to resemble bark or leaves.

 Nacunda nighthawk, Chordeiles nacunda
 Least nighthawk, Chordeiles pusillus
 Sand-colored nighthawk, Chordeiles rupestris
 Lesser nighthawk, Chordeiles acutipennis
 Common nighthawk, Chordeiles minor
 Antillean nighthawk, Chordeiles gundlachii (V)
 Short-tailed nighthawk, Lurocalis semitorquatus
 Band-tailed nighthawk, Nyctiprogne leucopyga (see note)
 Bahian nighthawk, Nyctiprogne vielliardi (E)
 Blackish nightjar, Nyctipolus nigrescens
 Pygmy nightjar, Nyctipolus hirundinaceus (E)
 Band-winged nightjar, Systellura longirostris
 Common pauraque, Nyctidromus albicollis
 White-winged nightjar, Eleothreptus candicans (endangered)
 Sickle-winged nightjar, Eleothreptus anomalus (near-threatened)
 Todd's nightjar, Setopagis heterura
 Little nightjar, Setopagis parvula
 Roraiman nightjar, Setopagis whitelyi
 White-tailed nightjar, Hydropsalis cayennensis
 Spot-tailed nightjar, Hydropsalis maculicaudus
 Ladder-tailed nightjar, Hydropsalis climacocerca
 Scissor-tailed nightjar, Hydropsalis torquata
 Long-trained nightjar, Macropsalis forcipata
 Ocellated poorwill, Nyctiphrynus ocellatus
 Silky-tailed nightjar, Antrostous sericocaudatus
 Rufous nightjar, Antrostomus rufus

Swifts

Order: ApodiformesFamily: Apodidae

Swifts are small birds which spend the majority of their lives flying. These birds have very short legs and never settle voluntarily on the ground, perching instead only on vertical surfaces. Many swifts have long swept-back wings which resemble a crescent or boomerang.

 White-chinned swift, Cypseloides cryptus
 Black swift, Cypseloides niger
 White-chested swift, Cypseloides lemosi (H)
 Sooty swift, Cypseloides fumigatus
 Great dusky swift, Cypseloides senex
 Tepui swift, Streptoprocne phelpsi
 White-collared swift, Streptoprocne zonaris
 Biscutate swift, Streptoprocne biscutata
 Gray-rumped swift, Chaetura cinereiventris
 Band-rumped swift, Chaetura spinicaudus
 Pale-rumped swift, Chaetura egregia
 Chimney swift, Chaetura pelagica 
 Chapman's swift, Chaetura chapmani
 Sick's swift, Chaetura meridionalis
 Short-tailed swift, Chaetura brachyura
 White-tipped swift, Aeronautes montivagus
 Fork-tailed palm-swift, Tachornis squamata
 Lesser swallow-tailed swift, Panyptila cayennensis

Hummingbirds
Order: ApodiformesFamily: Trochilidae

Hummingbirds are small birds capable of hovering in mid-air due to the rapid flapping of their wings. They are the only birds that can fly backwards. 

 Crimson topaz, Topaza pella
 Fiery topaz, Topaza pyra
 White-necked jacobin, Florisuga mellivora
 Black jacobin, Florisuga fusca
 Saw-billed hermit, Ramphodon naevius (E) (near-threatened)
 Hook-billed hermit, Glaucis dohrnii (E) (endangered)
 Rufous-breasted hermit, Glaucis hirsutus
 Pale-tailed barbthroat, Threnetes leucurus
 Sooty barbthroat, Threnetes niger
 Broad-tipped hermit, Anopetia gounellei (E)
 Dusky-throated hermit, Phaethornis squalidus (E)
 Streak-throated hermit, Phaethornis rupurumii
 Tapajos hermit, Phaethornis aethopygus (E)
 Minute hermit, Phaethornis idaliae (E)
 Cinnamon-throated hermit, Phaethornis nattereri
 Gray-chinned hermit, Phaethornis griseogularis
 Reddish hermit, Phaethornis ruber
 Buff-bellied hermit, Phaethornis subochraceus
 Sooty-capped hermit, Phaethornis augusti
 Planalto hermit, Phaethornis pretrei
 Scale-throated hermit, Phaethornis eurynome
 White-bearded hermit, Phaethornis hispidus
 Needle-billed hermit, Phaethornis philippii
 Straight-billed hermit, Phaethornis bourcieri
 Long-tailed hermit, Phaethornis superciliosus
 Great-billed hermit, Phaethornis malaris
 Blue-fronted lancebill, Doryfera johannae
 Hyacinth visorbearer, Augastes scutatus (E) (near-threatened)
 Hooded visorbearer, Augastes lumachella (E) (near-threatened)
 Brown violetear, Colibri delphinae
 Sparkling violetear, Colibri coruscans
 White-vented violetear, Colibri serrirostris
 Horned sungem, Heliactin bilophus
 Black-eared fairy, Heliothryx auritus
 White-tailed goldenthroat, Polytmus guainumbi
 Green-tailed goldenthroat, Polytmus theresiae
 Fiery-tailed awlbill, Avocettula recurvirostris
 Ruby-topaz hummingbird, Chrysolampis mosquitus
 Green-throated mango, Anthracothorax viridigula
 Black-throated mango, Anthracothorax nigricollis
 Black-bellied thorntail, Discosura langsdorffi
 Racket-tailed thorntail, Discosura longicaudus
 Tufted coquette, Lophornis ornatus
 Dot-eared coquette, Lophornis gouldii
 Frilled coquette, Lophornis magnificus (E)
 Spangled coquette, Lophornis stictolophus
 Butterfly coquette, Lophornis verreauxii
 Festive coquette, Lophornis chalybeus
 Peacock coquette, Lophornis pavoninus
 Velvet-browed brilliant, Heliodoxa xanthogonys
 Black-throated brilliant, Heliodoxa schreibersii
 Gould's jewelfront, Heliodoxa aurescens
 Brazilian ruby, Heliodoxa rubricauda (E)
 Long-billed starthroat, Heliomaster longirostris
 Stripe-breasted starthroat, Heliomaster squamosus (E)
 Blue-tufted starthroat, Heliomaster furcifer
 Amethyst woodstar, Calliphlox amethystina
 Blue-tailed emerald, Chlorostilbon mellisugus
 Glittering-bellied emerald, Chlorostilbon lucidus
 Blue-chinned sapphire, Chlorestes notata
 Green-crowned plovercrest, Stephanoxis lalandi (E)
 Purple-crowned plovercrest, Stephanoxis loddigesii
 Gray-breasted sabrewing, Campylopterus largipennis
 Outcrop sabrewing, Campylopterus calcirupicola (E)
 Diamantina sabrewing, Campylopterus diamantinensis (E)
 Rufous-breasted sabrewing, Campylopterus hyperythrus
 Buff-breasted sabrewing, Campylopterus duidae
 Fork-tailed woodnymph, Thalurania furcata
 Long-tailed woodnymph, Thalurania watertonii (E)
 Violet-capped woodnymph, Thalurania glaucopis
 Swallow-tailed hummingbird, Eupetomena macroura
 Sombre hummingbird, Eupetomena cirrochloris (E)
 Olive-spotted hummingbird, Talaphorus chlorocercus
 Green-bellied hummingbird, Saucerottia viridigaster
 Versicolored emerald, Chrysuronia versicolor
 Golden-tailed sapphire, Chrysuronia oenone
 White-chested emerald, Chrysuronia brevirostris
 Plain-bellied emerald, Chrysuronia leucogaster
 White-throated hummingbird, Leucochloris albicollis
 Glittering-throated emerald, Chionomesa fimbriata
 Sapphire-spangled emerald, Chionomesa lactea
 Rufous-throated sapphire, Hylocharis sapphirina
 Gilded hummingbird, Hylocharis chrysura
 White-bellied hummingbird, Elliotomyia chionogaster
 White-chinned sapphire, Chlorestes cyanus

Hoatzin

Order: OpisthocomiformesFamily: Opisthocomidae

The hoatzin is pheasant-sized, but much slimmer. It has a long tail and neck, but a small head with an unfeathered blue face and red eyes which are topped by a spiky crest. It is a weak flier which is found in the swamps of the Amazon and Orinoco rivers.

 Hoatzin, Opisthocomus hoazin

Limpkin

Order: GruiformesFamily: Aramidae

The limpkin resembles a large rail. It has drab-brown plumage and a grayer head and neck.

 Limpkin, Aramus guarauna

Trumpeters
Order: GruiformesFamily: Psophiidae

The trumpeters are dumpy birds with long necks and legs and chicken-like bills. They are named for the trumpeting call of the males.

 Gray-winged trumpeter, Psophia crepitans
 Pale-winged trumpeter, Psophia leucoptera
 Dark-winged trumpeter, Psophia viridis (E)

Rails

Order: GruiformesFamily: Rallidae

Rallidae is a large family of small to medium-sized birds which includes the rails, crakes, coots, and gallinules. Typically they inhabit dense vegetation in damp environments near lakes, swamps, or rivers. In general they are shy and secretive birds, making them difficult to observe. Most species have strong legs and long toes which are well adapted to soft uneven surfaces. They tend to have short, rounded wings and to be weak fliers.

 Corn crake, Crex crex (V)
 Mangrove rail, Rallus longirostris
 Allen's gallinule, Porphyrio alleni (V)
 American purple gallinule, Porphyrio martinica
 Azure gallinule, Porphyrio flavirostris
 Chestnut-headed crake, Anurolimnas castaneiceps
 Russet-crowned crake, Anurolimnas viridis
 Black-banded crake, Anurolimnas fasciatus
 Rufous-sided crake, Laterallus melanophaius
 Gray-breasted crake, Laterallus exilis
 Black rail, Laterallus jamaicensis
 Red-and-white crake, Laterallus leucopyrrhus
 Rufous-faced crake, Laterallus xenopterus
 Speckled rail, Coturnicops notatus
 Ocellated crake, Micropygia schomburgkii
 Ash-throated crake, Mustelirallus albicollis
 Paint-billed crake, Mustelirallus erythrops
 Spotted rail, Pardirallus maculatus
 Blackish rail, Pardirallus nigricans
 Plumbeous rail, Pardirallus sanguinolentus
 Giant wood-rail, Aramides ypecaha
 Little wood-rail, Aramides mangle (E)
 Gray-cowled wood-rail, Aramides cajaneus
 Red-winged wood-rail, Aramides calopterus
 Slaty-breasted wood-rail, Aramides saracura
 Uniform crake, Amaurolimnas concolor
 Spot-flanked gallinule, Porphyriops melanops
 Yellow-breasted crake, Porzana flaviventer
 Dot-winged crake, Porzana spiloptera (vulnerable)
 Sora, Porzana carolina (V)
 Common gallinule, Gallinula galeata
 Lesser moorhen, Gallinula angulata (V)
 Red-fronted coot, Fulica rufifrons
 Red-gartered coot, Fulica armillata
 White-winged coot, Fulica leucoptera

Finfoots
Order: GruiformesFamily: Heliornithidae

Heliornithidae is a small family of tropical birds with webbed lobes on their feet similar to those of grebes and coots.

 Sungrebe, Heliornis fulica

Plovers

Order: CharadriiformesFamily: Charadriidae

The family Charadriidae includes the plovers, dotterels, and lapwings. They are small to medium-sized birds with compact bodies, short thick necks, and long, usually pointed, wings. They are found in open country worldwide, mostly in habitats near water. 

 American golden-plover, Pluvialis dominica
 Black-bellied plover, Pluvialis squatarola
 Tawny-throated dotterel, Oreopholus ruficollis
 Pied lapwing, Vanellus cayanus
 Southern lapwing, Vanellus chilensis
 Rufous-chested dotterel, Charadrius modestus
 Semipalmated plover, Charadrius semipalmatus
 Wilson's plover, Charadrius wilsonia
 Collared plover, Charadrius collaris
 Two-banded plover, Charadrius falklandicus

Oystercatchers
Order: CharadriiformesFamily: Haematopodidae

The oystercatchers are large and noisy plover-like birds, with strong bills used for smashing or prising open molluscs.

 American oystercatcher, Haematopus palliatus

Avocets and stilts

Order: CharadriiformesFamily: Recurvirostridae

Recurvirostridae is a family of large wading birds which includes the avocets and stilts. The avocets have long legs and long up-curved bills. The stilts have extremely long legs and long, thin, straight bills.

 Black-necked stilt, Himantopus mexicanus

Thick-knees
Order: CharadriiformesFamily: Burhinidae

The thick-knees are a group of largely tropical waders in the family Burhinidae. They are found worldwide within the tropical zone, with some species also breeding in temperate Europe and Australia. They are medium to large waders with strong black or yellow-black bills, large yellow eyes, and cryptic plumage. Despite being classed as waders, most species have a preference for arid or semi-arid habitats.

 Double-striped thick-knee, Burhinus bistriatus

Sheathbills
Order: CharadriiformesFamily: Chionidae

The sheathbills are scavengers of the Antarctic regions. They have white plumage and look plump and dove-like but are believed to be similar to the ancestors of the modern gulls and terns.

 Snowy sheathbill, Chionis alba

Sandpipers

Order: CharadriiformesFamily: Scolopacidae

Scolopacidae is a large diverse family of small to medium-sized shorebirds including the sandpipers, curlews, godwits, shanks, tattlers, woodcocks, snipes, dowitchers, and phalaropes. The majority of these species eat small invertebrates picked out of the mud or soil. Variation in length of legs and bills enables multiple species to feed in the same habitat, particularly on the coast, without direct competition for food.

 Upland sandpiper, Bartramia longicauda
 Eskimo curlew, Numenius borealis (believed extinct)
 Whimbrel, Numenius phaeopus
 Bar-tailed godwit, Limosa lapponica (V)
 Hudsonian godwit, Limosa haemastica
 Marbled godwit, Limosa fedoa (V)
 Ruddy turnstone, Arenaria interpres
 Red knot, Calidris canutus
 Ruff, Calidris pugnax (V)
 Stilt sandpiper, Calidris himantopus
 Curlew sandpiper, Calidris ferruginea (V)
 Sanderling, Calidris alba
 Baird's sandpiper, Calidris bairdii
 Little stint, Calidris minuta (V)
 Least sandpiper, Calidris minutilla
 White-rumped sandpiper, Calidris fuscicollis
 Buff-breasted sandpiper, Calidris subruficollis (near-threatened)
 Pectoral sandpiper, Calidris melanotos
 Semipalmated sandpiper, Calidris pusilla
 Western sandpiper, Calidris mauri (V)
 Short-billed dowitcher, Limnodromus griseus
 Giant snipe, Gallinago undulata
 Pantanal snipe, Gallinago paraguaiae
 Wilson's phalarope, Phalaropus tricolor
 Red-necked phalarope, Phalaropus lobatus (V)
 Red phalarope, Phalaropus fulicarius (V)
 Terek sandpiper, Xenus cinereus (V)
 Spotted sandpiper, Actitis macularia
 Solitary sandpiper, Tringa solitaria
 Greater yellowlegs, Tringa melanoleuca
 Willet, Tringa semipalmata
 Lesser yellowlegs, Tringa flavipes
 Common redshank, Tringa totanus (V)
 Wood sandpiper, Tringa glareola (V)

Seedsnipes
Order: CharadriiformesFamily: Thinocoridae

The seedsnipes are a small family of birds that superficially resemble sparrows. They have short legs and long wings and are herbivorous waders.

 Least seedsnipe, Thinocorus rumicivorus (V)

Jacanas

Order: CharadriiformesFamily: Jacanidae

The jacanas are a family of waders found throughout the tropics. They are identifiable by their huge feet and claws which enable them to walk on floating vegetation in the shallow lakes that are their preferred habitat.

 Wattled jacana, Jacana jacanaPainted-snipes
Order: CharadriiformesFamily: Rostratulidae

Painted-snipes are short-legged, long-billed birds similar in shape to the true snipes, but more brightly colored.

 South American painted-snipe, Nycticryphes semicollarisPratincoles and coursers
Order: CharadriiformesFamily: Glareolidae

Glareolidae is a family of wading birds comprising the pratincoles, which have short legs, long pointed wings and long forked tails, and the coursers, which have long legs, short wings and long, pointed bills which curve downwards.

 Collared pratincole, Glareola pratincola (V)

Skuas

Order: CharadriiformesFamily: Stercorariidae

The family Stercorariidae are, in general, medium to large birds, typically with gray or brown plumage, often with white markings on the wings. They nest on the ground in temperate and arctic regions and are long-distance migrants.

 Great skua, Stercorarius skua Chilean skua, Stercorarius chilensis South polar skua, Stercorarius maccormicki Brown skua, Stercorarius antarcticus Pomarine jaeger, Stercorarius pomarinus Parasitic jaeger, Stercorarius parasiticus Long-tailed jaeger, Stercorarius longicaudusSkimmers
Order: CharadriiformesFamily: Rynchopidae

Skimmers are a small family of tropical tern-like birds. They have an elongated lower mandible which they use to feed by flying low over the water surface and skimming the water for small fish.

 Black skimmer, Rynchops nigerGulls

Order: CharadriiformesFamily: Laridae

Laridae is a family of medium to large seabirds and includes gulls, terns and skimmers. Gulls are typically gray or white, often with black markings on the head or wings. They have longish bills and webbed feet. Terns are a group of generally medium to large seabirds typically with grey or white plumage, often with black markings on the head. Most terns hunt fish by diving but some pick insects off the surface of fresh water. Terns are generally long-lived birds, with several species known to live in excess of 30 years.

 Sabine's gull, Xema sabini (V)
 Brown-hooded gull, Chroicocephalus maculipennis Gray-hooded gull, Chroicocephalus cirrocephalus Black-headed gull, Chroicocephalus ridibundus (V)
 Gray gull, Leucophaeus modestus (V)
 Laughing gull, Leucophaeus atricilla Franklin's gull, Leucophaeus pipixcan (V)
 Olrog's gull, Larus atlanticus Ring-billed gull, Larus delawarensis (V)
 Kelp gull, Larus dominicanus Lesser black-backed gull, Larus fuscus (V)
 Brown noddy, Anous stolidus Black noddy, Anous minutus White tern, Gygis alba Sooty tern, Onychoprion fuscata Least tern, Sternula antillarum Yellow-billed tern, Sternula superciliaris Large-billed tern, Phaetusa simplex Gull-billed tern, Gelochelidon nilotica Black tern, Chlidonias niger White-winged tern, Chlidonias leucopterus (V)
 Common tern, Sterna hirundo Roseate tern, Sterna dougallii Arctic tern, Sterna paradisaea South American tern, Sterna hirundinacea Antarctic tern, Sterna vittata (V)
 Snowy-crowned tern, Sterna trudeaui Sandwich tern, Thalasseus sandvicensis Royal tern, Thalasseus maximusSunbittern

Order: EurypygiformesFamily: Eurypygidae

The sunbittern is a bittern-like bird of tropical regions of the Americas and the sole member of the family Eurypygidae (sometimes spelled Eurypigidae) and genus Eurypyga.

 Sunbittern, Eurypyga heliasTropicbirds

Order: PhaethontiformesFamily: Phaethontidae

Tropicbirds are slender white birds of tropical oceans, with exceptionally long central tail feathers. Their heads and long wings have black markings.

 Red-billed tropicbird, Phaethon aethereus Red-tailed tropicbird, Phaethon rubricauda (V)
 White-tailed tropicbird, Phaethon lepturusPenguins

Order: SphenisciformesFamily: Spheniscidae

The penguins are a group of aquatic, flightless birds living almost exclusively in the Southern Hemisphere. Most penguins feed on krill, fish, squid, and other forms of sealife caught while swimming underwater.

 King penguin, Aptenodytes patagonicus (V)
 Magellanic penguin, Spheniscus magellanicus Macaroni penguin, Eudyptes chrysolophus (V) (vulnerable)
 Rockhopper penguin, Eudyptes chrysocome (V) (vulnerable)

Albatrosses

Order: ProcellariiformesFamily: Diomedeidae

The albatrosses are among the largest of flying birds, and the great albatrosses from the genus Diomedea have the largest wingspans of any extant birds.

 Royal albatross, Diomedea epomophora Wandering albatross, Diomedea exulans Sooty albatross, Phoebetria fusca (endangered)
 Light-mantled albatross, Phoebetria palpebrata Yellow-nosed albatross, Thalassarche chlororhynchos Black-browed albatross, Thalassarche melanophris Gray-headed albatross, Thalassarche chrysostoma (V) (endangered)
 White-capped albatross, Thalassarche cauta (V) (near-threatened)

Southern storm-petrels

Order: ProcellariiformesFamily: Oceanitidae

The storm-petrels are the smallest seabirds, relatives of the petrels, feeding on planktonic crustaceans and small fish picked from the surface, typically while hovering. The flight is fluttering and sometimes bat-like. Until 2018, this family's species were included with the other storm-petrels in family Hydrobatidae.

 White-bellied storm-petrel, Fregetta grallaria Black-bellied storm-petrel, Fregetta tropica Wilson's storm-petrel, Oceanites oceanicus White-faced storm-petrel, Pelagodroma marina (V)

Northern storm-petrels
Order: ProcellariiformesFamily: Hydrobatidae

Though the members of this family are similar in many respects to the southern storm-petrels, including their general appearance and habits, there are enough genetic differences to warrant their placement in a separate family.

 Band-rumped storm-petrel, Hydrobates castro (H)
 Leach's storm-petrel, Hydrobates leucorhoaShearwaters

Order: ProcellariiformesFamily: Procellariidae

The procellariids are the main group of medium-sized "true petrels", characterized by united nostrils with medium septum and a long outer functional primary.

 Southern giant-petrel, Macronectes giganteus Northern giant-petrel, Macronectes halli Southern fulmar, Fulmarus glacialoides Cape petrel, Daption capense Kerguelen petrel, Aphrodroma brevirostris (V)
 Great-winged petrel, Pterodroma macroptera (V)
 Soft-plumaged petrel, Pterodroma mollis Black-capped petrel, Pterodroma hasitata (H) (endangered)
 Atlantic petrel, Pterodroma incerta (endangered)
 White-headed petrel, Pterodroma lessonii (V)
 Trindade petrel, Pterodroma arminjoniana Fea's petrel, Pterodroma feae Blue petrel, Halobaena caerulea Broad-billed prion, Pachyptila vittata (V)
 Antarctic prion, Pachyptila desolata Slender-billed prion, Pachyptila belcheri Bulwer's petrel, Bulweria bulwerii Gray petrel, Procellaria cinerea (V) (near-threatened)
 White-chinned petrel, Procellaria aequinoctialis Spectacled petrel, Procellaria conspicillata Cory's shearwater, Calonectris diomedea Cape Verde shearwater, Calonectris edwardsii Short-tailed shearwater, Ardenna tenuirostris (V)
 Sooty shearwater, Ardenna grisea Great shearwater, Ardenna gravis Manx shearwater, Puffinus puffinus Little shearwater, Puffinus assimilis (H)
 Audubon's shearwater, Puffinus lherminieri Magellanic diving-petrel, Pelecanoides magellani (V)

Storks

Order: CiconiiformesFamily: Ciconiidae

Storks are large, long-legged, long-necked wading birds with long, stout bills. Storks are mute, but bill-clattering is an important mode of communication at the nest. Their nests can be large and may be reused for many years. Many species are migratory.

 Maguari stork, Ciconia maguari Jabiru, Jabiru mycteria Wood stork, Mycteria americanaFrigatebirds

Order: SuliformesFamily: Fregatidae

Frigatebirds are large seabirds usually found over tropical oceans. They are large, black-and-white or completely black, with long wings and deeply forked tails. The males have colored inflatable throat pouches. They do not swim or walk and cannot take off from a flat surface. Having the largest wingspan-to-body-weight ratio of any bird, they are essentially aerial, able to stay aloft for more than a week.

 Lesser frigatebird, Fregata ariel Ascension frigatebird, Fregata aquila (V)
 Magnificent frigatebird, Fregata magnificens Great frigatebird, Fregata minorBoobies
Order: SuliformesFamily: Sulidae

The sulids comprise the gannets and boobies. Both groups are medium to large coastal seabirds that plunge-dive for fish.

 Cape gannet, Morus capensis (V) (endangered)
 Australasian gannet, Morus serrator (V)
 Masked booby, Sula dactylatra Red-footed booby, Sula sula Brown booby, Sula leucogasterAnhingas

Order: SuliformesFamily: Anhingidae

Anhingas are often called "snake-birds" because of their long thin neck, which gives a snake-like appearance when they swim with their bodies submerged. The males have black and dark-brown plumage, an erectile crest on the nape, and a larger bill than the female. The females have much paler plumage especially on the neck and underparts. The darters have completely webbed feet and their legs are short and set far back on the body. Their plumage is somewhat permeable, like that of cormorants, and they spread their wings to dry after diving.

 Anhinga, Anhinga anhingaCormorants
Order: SuliformesFamily: Phalacrocoracidae

Phalacrocoracidae is a family of medium to large coastal, fish-eating seabirds that includes cormorants and shags. Plumage coloration varies, with the majority having mainly dark plumage, some species being black-and-white, and a few being colorful.

 Neotropic cormorant, Phalacrocorax brasilianus Imperial cormorant, Phalacrocorax atriceps (H)

Pelicans
Order: PelecaniformesFamily: Pelecanidae

Pelicans are large water birds with a distinctive pouch under their beak. As with other members of the order Pelecaniformes, they have webbed feet with four toes.

 Brown pelican, Pelecanus occidentalis (V)

Herons
thumb|right|Agami heron
Order: PelecaniformesFamily: Ardeidae

The family Ardeidae contains the bitterns, herons, and egrets. Herons and egrets are medium to large wading birds with long necks and legs. Bitterns tend to be shorter necked and more wary. Members of Ardeidae fly with their necks retracted, unlike other long-necked birds such as storks, ibises, and spoonbills.

 Rufescent tiger-heron, Tigrisoma lineatum Fasciated tiger-heron, Tigrisoma fasciatum Agami heron, Agamia agami Boat-billed heron, Cochlearius cochlearius Zigzag heron, Zebrilus undulatus Pinnated bittern, Botaurus pinnatus Least bittern, Ixobrychus exilis Stripe-backed bittern, Ixobrychus involucris Black-crowned night-heron, Nycticorax nycticorax Yellow-crowned night-heron, Nyctanassa violacea Striated heron, Butorides striata Squacco heron, Ardeola ralloides (V)
 Cattle egret, Bubulcus ibis Gray heron, Ardea cinerea (V)
 Great blue heron, Ardea herodias (H)
 Cocoi heron, Ardea cocoi Purple heron, Ardea purpurea (V)
 Great egret, Ardea alba Whistling heron, Syrigma sibilatrix Capped heron, Pilherodius pileatus Tricolored heron, Egretta tricolor Western reef-heron, Egretta gularis (V)
 Little egret, Egretta garzetta (V)
 Snowy egret, Egretta thula Little blue heron, Egretta caeruleaIbises

Order: PelecaniformesFamily: Threskiornithidae

Threskiornithidae is a family of large terrestrial and wading birds which includes the ibises and spoonbills. They have long, broad wings with 11 primary and about 20 secondary feathers. They are strong fliers and despite their size and weight, very capable soarers.

 Scarlet ibis, Eudocimus ruber White-faced ibis, Plegadis chihi Sharp-tailed ibis, Cercibis oxycerca Green ibis, Mesembrinibis cayennensis Bare-faced ibis, Phimosus infuscatus Plumbeous ibis, Theristicus caerulescens Buff-necked ibis, Theristicus caudatus Eurasian spoonbill, Platalea leucorodia (V)
 Roseate spoonbill, Platalea ajajaNew World vultures
Order: CathartiformesFamily: Cathartidae

The New World vultures are not closely related to Old World vultures, but superficially resemble them because of convergent evolution. Like the Old World vultures, they are scavengers. However, unlike Old World vultures, which find carcasses by sight, New World vultures have a good sense of smell with which they locate carrion.

 King vulture, Sarcoramphus papa Andean condor, Vultur gryphus (H)
 Black vulture, Coragyps atratus Turkey vulture, Cathartes aura Lesser yellow-headed vulture, Cathartes burrovianus Greater yellow-headed vulture, Cathartes melambrotusOsprey
Order: AccipitriformesFamily: Pandionidae

The family Pandionidae contains only one species, the osprey. The osprey is a medium-large raptor which is a specialist fish-eater with a worldwide distribution.

 Osprey, Pandion haliaetusHawks
Order: AccipitriformesFamily: Accipitridae

Accipitridae is a family of birds of prey, which includes hawks, eagles, kites, harriers, and Old World vultures. These birds have powerful hooked beaks for tearing flesh from their prey, strong legs, powerful talons, and keen eyesight.

 Pearl kite, Gampsonyx swainsonii White-tailed kite, Elanus leucurus Hook-billed kite, Chondrohierax uncinatus Gray-headed kite, Leptodon cayanensis White-collared kite, Leptodon forbesi (E) (endangered)
 Swallow-tailed kite, Elanoides forficatus Crested eagle, Morphnus guianensis (near-threatened)
 Harpy eagle, Harpia harpyja (near-threatened)
 Black hawk-eagle, Spizaetus tyrannus Black-and-white hawk-eagle, Spizaetus melanoleucus Ornate hawk-eagle, Spizaetus ornatus Black-collared hawk, Busarellus nigricollis Snail kite, Rostrhamus sociabilis Slender-billed kite, Helicolestes hamatus Double-toothed kite, Harpagus bidentatus Rufous-thighed kite, Harpagus diodon Mississippi kite, Ictinia mississippiensis Plumbeous kite, Ictinia plumbea Cinereous harrier, Circus cinereus Long-winged harrier, Circus buffoni Gray-bellied hawk, Accipiter poliogaster Sharp-shinned hawk, Accipiter striatus Bicolored hawk, Accipiter bicolor Tiny hawk, Microspizias superciliosus Black kite, Milvus migrans (V)
 Crane hawk, Geranospiza caerulescens Slate-colored hawk, Buteogallus schistaceus Common black hawk, Buteogallus anthracinus (H)
 Rufous crab hawk, Buteogallus aequinoctialis Savanna hawk, Buteogallus meridionalis White-necked hawk, Buteogallus lacernulatus (E) (vulnerable)
 Great black hawk, Buteogallus urubitinga Solitary eagle, Buteogallus solitarius Chaco eagle, Buteogallus coronatus (endangered)
 Roadside hawk, Rupornis magnirostris Harris's hawk, Parabuteo unicinctus White-rumped hawk, Parabuteo leucorrhous White-tailed hawk, Geranoaetus albicaudatus Variable hawk, Geranoaetus polyosoma (H)
 Black-chested buzzard-eagle, Geranoaetus melanoleucus Mantled hawk, Pseudastur polionotus (near-threatened)
 White hawk, Pseudastur albicollis Black-faced hawk, Leucopternis melanops White-browed hawk, Leucopternis kuhli Gray-lined hawk, Buteo nitidus Broad-winged hawk, Buteo platypterus Short-tailed hawk, Buteo brachyurus Swainson's hawk, Buteo swainsoni Zone-tailed hawk, Buteo albonotatusBarn owls
Order: StrigiformesFamily: Tytonidae

Barn owls are medium to large owls with large heads and characteristic heart-shaped faces. They have long strong legs with powerful talons.

 Barn owl, Tyto albaOwls

Order: StrigiformesFamily: Strigidae

The typical owls are small to large solitary nocturnal birds of prey. They have large forward-facing eyes and ears, a hawk-like beak, and a conspicuous circle of feathers around each eye called a facial disk.

 Tropical screech-owl, Megascops choliba Foothill screech-owl, Megascops roraimae Long-tufted screech-owl, Megascops sanctaecatarinae Tawny-bellied screech-owl, Megascops watsonii Black-capped screech-owl, Megascops atricapilla Crested owl, Lophostrix cristata Spectacled owl, Pulsatrix perspicillata Tawny-browed owl, Pulsatrix koeniswaldiana Great horned owl, Bubo virginianus Rusty-barred owl, Strix hylophila Mottled owl, Strix virgata Black-banded owl, Strix huhula Amazonian pygmy-owl, Glaucidium hardyi Pernambuco pygmy-owl, Glaucidium mooreorum (E) (critically endangered)
 Least pygmy-owl, Glaucidium minutissimum (E)
 Ferruginous pygmy-owl, Glaucidium brasilianum Burrowing owl, Athene cunicularia Buff-fronted owl, Aegolius harrisii Striped owl, Asio clamator Stygian owl, Asio stygius Short-eared owl, Asio flammeusTrogons

Order: TrogoniformesFamily: Trogonidae

The family Trogonidae includes trogons and quetzals. Found in tropical woodlands worldwide, they feed on insects and fruit, and their broad bills and weak legs reflect their diet and arboreal habits. Although their flight is fast, they are reluctant to fly any distance. Trogons have soft, often colorful, feathers with distinctive male and female plumage.

 Pavonine quetzal, Pharomachrus pavoninus Black-tailed trogon, Trogon melanurus Green-backed trogon, Trogon viridis Amazonian trogon, Trogon ramonianus Guianan trogon, Trogon violaceus Blue-crowned trogon, Trogon curucui Surucua trogon, Trogon surrucura Black-throated trogon, Trogon rufus (see note)
 Collared trogon, Trogon collaris Masked trogon, Trogon personatusMotmots
Order: CoraciiformesFamily: Momotidae

The motmots have colorful plumage and long, graduated tails which they display by waggling back and forth. In most of the species, the barbs near the ends of the two longest (central) tail feathers are weak and fall off, leaving a length of bare shaft and creating a racket-shaped tail. 

 Broad-billed motmot, Electron platyrhynchum Rufous motmot, Baryphthengus martii Rufous-capped motmot, Baryphthengus ruficapillus Amazonian motmot, Momotus momotaKingfishers

Order: CoraciiformesFamily: Alcedinidae

Kingfishers are medium-sized birds with large heads, long pointed bills, short legs, and stubby tails.

 Ringed kingfisher, Megaceryle torquata Amazon kingfisher, Chloroceryle amazona American pygmy kingfisher, Chloroceryle aenea Green kingfisher, Chloroceryle americana Green-and-rufous kingfisher, Chloroceryle indaJacamars

Order: GalbuliformesFamily: Galbulidae

The jacamars are near passerine birds from tropical South America with a range that extends up to Mexico. They feed on insects caught on the wing and are glossy, elegant birds with long bills and tails. They resemble the Old World bee-eaters, although they are more closely related to puffbirds.

 White-eared jacamar, Galbalcyrhynchus leucotis Purus jacamar, Galbalcyrhynchus purusianus White-throated jacamar, Brachygalba albogularis Brown jacamar, Brachygalba lugubris Three-toed jacamar, Jacamaralcyon tridactyla (E) (vulnerable)
 Yellow-billed jacamar, Galbula albirostris Blue-cheeked jacamar, Galbula cyanicollis Rufous-tailed jacamar, Galbula ruficauda Green-tailed jacamar, Galbula galbula White-chinned jacamar, Galbula tombacea Bluish-fronted jacamar, Galbula cyanescens Purplish jacamar, Galbula chalcothorax Bronzy jacamar, Galbula leucogastra Paradise jacamar, Galbula dea Great jacamar, Jacamerops aureusPuffbirds

Order: GalbuliformesFamily: Bucconidae

The puffbirds are related to the jacamars and have the same range, but lack the iridescent colors of that family. They are mainly brown, rufous, or gray, with large heads and flattened bills with hooked tips. The loose abundant plumage and short tails makes them look stout and puffy, giving rise to the English common name of the family.

 White-necked puffbird, Notharchus hyperrhynchus Guianan puffbird, Notharchus macrorhynchos Buff-bellied puffbird, Notharchus swainsoni Brown-banded puffbird, Notharchus ordii Pied puffbird, Notharchus tectus Chestnut-capped puffbird, Bucco macrodactylus Spotted puffbird, Bucco tamatia Collared puffbird, Bucco capensis Western striolated-puffbird, Nystalus obamai 
 Eastern striolated-puffbird, Nystalus striolatus White-eared puffbird, Nystalus chacuru Spot-backed puffbird, Nystalus maculatus White-chested puffbird, Malacoptila fusca Semicollared puffbird, Malacoptila semicincta Crescent-chested puffbird, Malacoptila striata (E)
 Rufous-necked puffbird, Malacoptila rufa Lanceolated monklet, Micromonacha lanceolata Rusty-breasted nunlet, Nonnula rubecula Fulvous-chinned nunlet, Nonnula sclateri Rufous-capped nunlet, Nonnula ruficapilla Chestnut-headed nunlet, Nonnula amaurocephala (E)
 Black nunbird, Monasa atra Black-fronted nunbird, Monasa nigrifrons White-fronted nunbird, Monasa morphoeus Yellow-billed nunbird, Monasa flavirostris Swallow-winged puffbird, Chelidoptera tenebrosaNew World barbets
Order: PiciformesFamily: Capitonidae

The barbets are plump birds, with short necks and large heads. They get their name from the bristles which fringe their heavy bills. Most species are brightly colored.

 Scarlet-crowned barbet, Capito aurovirens Black-girdled barbet, Capito dayi Brown-chested barbet, Capito brunneipectus (E)
 Black-spotted barbet, Capito niger Gilded barbet, Capito auratus Lemon-throated barbet, Eubucco richardsoni Scarlet-hooded barbet, Eubucco tucinkaeToucans

Order: PiciformesFamily: Ramphastidae

Toucans are near passerine birds from the Neotropics. They are brightly marked and have enormous, colorful bills which in some species amount to half their body length.

 Southern emerald-toucanet, Aulacorhynchus albivitta Tepui toucanet, Aulacorhynchus whitelianus Saffron toucanet, Pteroglossus bailloni (near-threatened)
 Green aracari, Pteroglossus viridis Lettered aracari, Pteroglossus inscriptus Black-necked aracari, Pteroglossus aracari Chestnut-eared aracari, Pteroglossus castanotis Many-banded aracari, Pteroglossus pluricinctus Ivory-billed aracari, Pteroglossus azara Curl-crested aracari, Pteroglossus beauharnaisii Red-necked aracari, Pteroglossus bitorquatus Guianan toucanet, Selenidera piperivora Golden-collared toucanet, Selenidera reinwardtii Tawny-tufted toucanet, Selenidera nattereri Gould's toucanet, Selenidera gouldii Spot-billed toucanet, Selenidera maculirostris Toco toucan, Ramphastos toco White-throated toucan, Ramphastos tucanus Channel-billed toucan, Ramphastos vitellinus Red-breasted toucan, Ramphastos dicolorusWoodpeckers

Order: PiciformesFamily: Picidae

Woodpeckers are small to medium-sized birds with chisel-like beaks, short legs, stiff tails, and long tongues used for capturing insects. Some species have feet with two toes pointing forward and two backward, while several species have only three toes. Many woodpeckers have the habit of tapping noisily on tree trunks with their beaks.

 Bar-breasted piculet, Picumnus aurifrons Orinoco piculet, Picumnus pumilus Lafresnaye's piculet, Picumnus lafresnayi Golden-spangled piculet, Picumnus exilis White-bellied piculet, Picumnus spilogaster Ochraceous piculet, Picumnus limae (E)
 Spotted piculet, Picumnus pygmaeus (E)
 Varzea piculet, Picumnus varzeae (E)
 White-barred piculet, Picumnus cirratus Ochre-collared piculet, Picumnus temminckii White-wedged piculet, Picumnus albosquamatus Rusty-necked piculet, Picumnus fuscus Rufous-breasted piculet, Picumnus rufiventristhreatened)
 Mottled piculet, Picumnus nebulosus (near-threatened)
 Plain-breasted piculet, Picumnus castelnau Fine-barred piculet, Picumnus subtilis White woodpecker, Melanerpes candidus Yellow-tufted woodpecker, Melanerpes cruentatus Yellow-fronted woodpecker, Melanerpes flavifrons White-fronted woodpecker, Melanerpes cactorum Red-rumped woodpecker, Dryobates kirkii Golden-collared woodpecker, Dryobates cassini White-spotted woodpecker, Dryobates spilogaster Checkered woodpecker, Dryobates mixtus Little woodpecker, Dryobates passerinus Red-stained woodpecker, Dryobates affinis Yellow-eared woodpecker, Dryobates maculifrons (E)
 Red-necked woodpecker, Campephilus rubricollis Robust woodpecker, Campephilus robustus Crimson-crested woodpecker, Campephilus melanoleucos Cream-backed woodpecker, Campephilus leucopogon Lineated woodpecker, Dryocopus lineatus Ringed woodpecker, Celeus torquatus Helmeted woodpecker, Celeus galeatus (vulnerable)
 Scale-breasted woodpecker, Celeus grammicus Waved woodpecker, Celeus undatus Cream-colored woodpecker, Celeus flavus Rufous-headed woodpecker, Celeus spectabilis Kaempfer's woodpecker, Celeus obrieni (E)
 Ochre-backed woodpecker, Celeus ochraceus (E)
 Chestnut woodpecker, Celeus elegans Pale-crested woodpecker, Celeus lugubris Blond-crested woodpecker, Celeus flavescens White-throated woodpecker, Piculus leucolaemus Yellow-throated woodpecker, Piculus flavigula Golden-green woodpecker, Piculus chrysochloros White-browed woodpecker, Piculus aurulentus (near-threatened)
 Golden-olive woodpecker, Colaptes rubiginosus Spot-breasted woodpecker, Colaptes punctigula Green-barred woodpecker, Colaptes melanochloros Campo flicker, Colaptes campestrisSeriemas

Order: CariamiformesFamily: Cariamidae

The seriemas are terrestrial birds which run rather than fly (though they are able to fly for short distances). They have long legs, necks and tails, but only short wings, reflecting their way of life. They are brownish birds with short bills and erectile crests, found on fairly-dry open grasslands.

 Red-legged seriema, Cariama cristataFalcons

Order: FalconiformesFamily: Falconidae

Falconidae is a family of diurnal birds of prey. They differ from hawks, eagles and kites in that they kill with their beaks instead of their talons.

 Laughing falcon, Herpetotheres cachinnans Barred forest-falcon, Micrastur ruficollis Lined forest-falcon, Micrastur gilvicollis Cryptic forest-falcon, Micrastur mintoni Slaty-backed forest-falcon, Micrastur mirandollei Collared forest-falcon, Micrastur semitorquatus Buckley's forest-falcon, Micrastur buckleyi Crested caracara, Caracara plancus Red-throated caracara, Ibycter americanus Black caracara, Daptrius ater Yellow-headed caracara, Milvago chimachima Chimango caracara, Milvago chimango Eurasian kestrel, Falco tinnunculus (V)
 American kestrel, Falco sparverius Merlin, Falco columbarius (V)
 Bat falcon, Falco rufigularis Orange-breasted falcon, Falco deiroleucus Aplomado falcon, Falco femoralis Peregrine falcon, Falco peregrinusNew World and African parrots
Order: PsittaciformesFamily: Psittacidae

Parrots are small to large birds with a characteristic curved beak. Their upper mandibles have slight mobility in the joint with the skull and they have a generally erect stance. All parrots are zygodactyl, having the four toes on each foot placed two at the front and two to the back.

 Scarlet-shouldered parrotlet, Touit huetii Sapphire-rumped parrotlet, Touit purpuratus Brown-backed parrotlet, Touit melanonotus (E) (vulnerable)
 Golden-tailed parrotlet, Touit surdus (E) (vulnerable)
 Tepui parrotlet, Nannopsittaca panychlora Amazonian parrotlet, Nannopsittaca dachilleae Monk parakeet, Myiopsitta monachus Tui parakeet, Brotogeris sanctithomae Plain parakeet, Brotogeris tirica (E)
 Canary-winged parakeet, Brotogeris versicolurus Yellow-chevroned parakeet, Brotogeris chiriri Cobalt-winged parakeet, Brotogeris cyanoptera Golden-winged parakeet, Brotogeris chrysoptera Pileated parrot, Pionopsitta pileata Blue-bellied parrot, Triclaria malachitacea (E) (near-threatened)
 Orange-cheeked parrot, Pyrilia barrabandi Caica parrot, Pyrilia caica Bald parrot, Pyrilia aurantiocephala (E)
 Vulturine parrot, Pyrilia vulturina (E)
 Dusky parrot, Pionus fuscus Scaly-headed parrot, Pionus maximiliani Blue-headed parrot, Pionus menstruus Short-tailed parrot, Graydidascalus brachyurus Yellow-faced parrot, Alipiopsitta xanthops (near-threatened)
 Festive parrot, Amazona festiva Vinaceous-breasted parrot, Amazona vinacea (endangered)
 Red-spectacled parrot, Amazona pretrei (E) (vulnerable)
 Red-lored parrot, Amazona autumnalis Blue-cheeked parrot, Amazona dufresniana (near-threatened)
 Red-browed parrot, Amazona rhodocorytha (E) (vulnerable)
 Yellow-crowned parrot, Amazona ochrocephala Turquoise-fronted parrot, Amazona aestiva Mealy parrot, Amazona farinosa Kawall's parrot, Amazona kawalli (E)
 Red-tailed parrot, Amazona brasiliensis (E) (near-threatened)
 Orange-winged parrot, Amazona amazonica Dusky-billed parrotlet, Forpus modestus Riparian parrotlet, Forpus crassirostris Cobalt-rumped parrotlet, Forpus xanthopterygius Green-rumped parrotlet, Forpus passerinus Black-headed parrot, Pionites melanocephalus White-bellied parrot, Pionites leucogaster Red-fan parrot, Deroptyus accipitrinus Ochre-marked parakeet, Pyrrhura cruentata (E) (vulnerable)
 Blaze-winged parakeet, Pyrrhura devillei Maroon-bellied parakeet, Pyrrhura frontalis Pearly parakeet, Pyrrhura lepida (E) (vulnerable)
 Crimson-bellied parakeet, Pyrrhura perlata Green-cheeked parakeet, Pyrrhura molinae Pfrimer's parakeet, Pyrrhura pfrimeri (E)
 Gray-breasted parakeet, Pyrrhura griseipectus (E)
 Maroon-faced parakeet, Pyrrhura leucotis (E)
 Painted parakeet, Pyrrhura picta Santarem parakeet, Pyrrhura amazonum Bonaparte's parakeet, Pyrrhura lucianii Rose-fronted parakeet, Pyrrhura roseifrons Fiery-shouldered parakeet, Pyrrhura egregia Maroon-tailed parakeet, Pyrrhura melanura Black-capped parakeet, Pyrrhura rupicola Hyacinth macaw, Anodorhynchus hyacinthinus (vulnerable)
 Glaucous macaw, Anodorhynchus glaucus (critically endangered, possibly extinct)
 Indigo macaw, Anodorhynchus leari (E) (endangered)
 Peach-fronted parakeet, Eupsittula aurea Brown-throated parakeet, Eupsittula pertinax Cactus parakeet, Eupsittula cactorum (E)
 Dusky-headed parakeet, Aratinga weddellii Nanday parakeet, Aratinga nenday Sun parakeet, Aratinga solstitialis Sulphur-breasted parakeet, Aratinga maculata Jandaya parakeet, Aratinga jandaya (E)
 Golden-capped parakeet, Aratinga auricapillus (E)
 Spix's macaw, Cyanopsitta spixii (E) (extinct in the wild)
 Red-bellied macaw, Orthopsittaca manilatus Blue-winged macaw, Primolius maracana (near-threatened)
 Blue-headed macaw, Primolius couloni Yellow-collared macaw, Primolius auricollis Blue-and-yellow macaw, Ara ararauna Chestnut-fronted macaw, Ara severus Scarlet macaw, Ara macao Red-and-green macaw, Ara chloropterus Golden parakeet, Guaruba guarouba (E) (vulnerable)
 Blue-crowned parakeet, Thectocercus acuticaudatus Red-shouldered macaw, Diopsittaca nobilis White-eyed parakeet, Psittacara leucophthalmusAntbirds

Order: PasseriformesFamily: Thamnophilidae

The antbirds are a large family of small passerine birds of subtropical and tropical Central and South America. They are forest birds which tend to feed on insects at or near the ground. A sizable minority of them specialize in following columns of army ants to eat small invertebrates that leave their hiding places to flee from the ants. Many species lack bright color, with brown, black, and white being the dominant tones.

 Chestnut-shouldered antwren, Euchrepomis humeralis Ash-winged antwren, Euchrepomis spodioptila Fasciated antshrike, Cymbilaimus lineatus Bamboo antshrike, Cymbilaimus sanctaemariae Spot-backed antshrike, Hypoedaleus guttatus Giant antshrike, Batara cinerea Large-tailed antshrike, Mackenziaena leachii Tufted antshrike, Mackenziaena severa Black-throated antshrike, Frederickena viridis Undulated antshrike, Frederickena unduliger Great antshrike, Taraba major Black-crested antshrike, Sakesphorus canadensis Glossy antshrike, Sakesphorus luctuosus (E)
 Caatinga antwren, Radinopsyche sellowi (E)
 White-bearded antshrike, Biatas nigropectus (vulnerable)
 Barred antshrike, Thamnophilus doliatus Rufous-capped antshrike, Thamnophilus ruficapillus Rufous-winged antshrike, Thamnophilus torquatus Chestnut-backed antshrike, Thamnophilus palliatus Plain-winged antshrike, Thamnophilus schistaceus Mouse-colored antshrike, Thamnophilus murinus Castelnau's antshrike, Thamnophilus cryptoleucus Blackish-gray antshrike, Thamnophilus nigrocinereus Northern slaty-antshrike, Thamnophilus punctatus Natterer's slaty-antshrike, Thamnophilus stictocephalus Bolivian slaty-antshrike, Thamnophilus sticturus Planalto slaty-antshrike, Thamnophilus pelzelni (E)
 Sooretama slaty-antshrike, Thamnophilus ambiguus (E)
 Variable antshrike, Thamnophilus caerulescens White-shouldered antshrike, Thamnophilus aethiops Band-tailed antshrike, Thamnophilus melanothorax Amazonian antshrike, Thamnophilus amazonicus Streak-backed antshrike, Thamnophilus insignis Acre antshrike, Thamnophilus divisorius Star-throated antwren, Rhopias gularis (E)
 Pearly antshrike, Megastictus margaritatus Black bushbird, Neoctantes niger Rondonia bushbird, Clytoctantes atrogularis (E) (vulnerable)
 Silvery-cheeked antshrike, Sakesphoroides cristatus (E)
 Spot-breasted antvireo, Dysithamnus stictothorax (E) (near-threatened)
 Plain antvireo, Dysithamnus mentalis Rufous-backed antvireo, Dysithamnus xanthopterus (E)
 Plumbeous antvireo, Dysithamnus plumbeus (E) (vulnerable)
 Predicted antwren, Herpsilochmus praedictus (E)
 Aripuana antwren, Herpsilochmus stotzi (E)
 Black-capped antwren, Herpsilochmus atricapillus Bahia antwren, Herpsilochmus pileatus (E) (vulnerable)
 Spot-tailed antwren, Herpsilochmus sticturus Todd's antwren, Herpsilochmus stictocephalus Spot-backed antwren, Herpsilochmus dorsimaculatus Roraiman antwren, Herpsilochmus roraimae Pectoral antwren, Herpsilochmus pectoralis (E) (vulnerable)
 Large-billed antwren, Herpsilochmus longirostris Rufous-margined antwren, Herpsilochmus frater 
 Rusty-winged antwren, Herpsilochmus rufimarginatus Dusky-throated antshrike, Thamnomanes ardesiacus Saturnine antshrike, Thamnomanes saturninus Cinereous antshrike, Thamnomanes caesius Bluish-slate antshrike, Thamnomanes schistogynus Plain-throated antwren, Isleria hauxwelli Rufous-bellied antwren, Isleria guttata Spot-winged antshrike, Pygiptila stellaris Ornate stipplethroat, Epinecrophylla ornata Rufous-tailed stipplethroat, Epinecrophylla erythrura White-eyed stipplethroat, Epinecrophylla leucophthalma Brown-bellied stipplethroat, Epinecrophylla gutturalis Rufous-backed stipplethroat, Epinecrophylla haematonota Rio Madeira stipplethroat, Epinecrophylla amazonica Pygmy antwren, Myrmotherula brachyura Moustached antwren, Myrmotherula ignota Yellow-throated antwren, Myrmotherula ambigua Sclater's antwren, Myrmotherula sclateri Guianan streaked-antwren, Myrmotherula surinamensis Amazonian streaked-antwren, Myrmotherula multostriata Cherrie's antwren, Myrmotherula cherriei Klages's antwren, Myrmotherula klagesi (E) (vulnerable)
 White-flanked antwren, Myrmotherula axillaris Rio Suno antwren, Myrmotherula sunensis Salvadori's antwren, Myrmotherula minor (E) (vulnerable)
 Long-winged antwren, Myrmotherula longipennis Band-tailed antwren, Myrmotherula urosticta (E) (vulnerable)
 Ihering's antwren, Myrmotherula iheringi Rio de Janeiro antwren, Myrmotherula fluminensis (E) (not yet assessed by IUCN)
 Unicolored antwren, Myrmotherula unicolor (E)
 Alagoas antwren, Myrmotherula snowi (E) (critically endangered)
 Plain-winged antwren, Myrmotherula behni Gray antwren, Myrmotherula menetriesii Leaden antwren, Myrmotherula assimilis Banded antbird, Dichrozona cincta Stripe-backed antbird, Myrmorchilus strigilatus Dot-winged antwren, Microrhopias quixensis Narrow-billed antwren, Formicivora iheringi (E) (near-threatened)
 Black-hooded antwren, Formicivora erythronotos (E) (endangered)
 White-fringed antwren, Formicivora grisea Serra antwren, Formicivora serrana (E)
 Restinga antwren, Formicivora littoralis (E) (not yet assessed by IUCN)
 Black-bellied antwren, Formicivora melanogaster Rusty-backed antwren, Formicivora rufa Sincora antwren, Formicivora grantsaui (E) (endangered)
 Marsh antwren, Formicivora acutirostris (E) (endangered)
 Ferruginous antbird, Drymophila ferruginea (E)
 Bertoni's antbird, Drymophila rubricollis Rufous-tailed antbird, Drymophila genei (E)
 Ochre-rumped antbird, Drymophila ochropyga (E) (near-threatened)
 Dusky-tailed antbird, Drymophila malura Scaled antbird, Drymophila squamata (E)
 Striated antbird, Drymophila devillei Guianan warbling-antbird, Hypocnemis cantator Imeri warbling-antbird, Hypocnemis flavescens Peruvian warbling-antbird, Hypocnemis peruviana Yellow-breasted warbling-antbird, Hypocnemis subflava Manicore warbling-antbird, Hypocnemis rondoni (E)
 Rondonia warbling-antbird, Hypocnemis ochrogyna Spix's warbling-antbird, Hypocnemis striata (E)
 Yellow-browed antbird, Hypocnemis hypoxantha Orange-bellied antwren, Terenura sicki (E) (critically endangered)
 Streak-capped antwren, Terenura maculata Willis's antbird, Cercomacroides laeta Dusky antbird, Cercomacroides tyrannina Black antbird, Cercomacroides serva Blackish antbird, Cercomacroides nigrescens Riparian antbird, Cercomacroides fuscicauda Manu antbird, Cercomacra manu Gray antbird, Cercomacra cinerascens Rio de Janeiro antbird, Cercomacra brasiliana (E) (near-threatened)
 Mato Grosso antbird, Cercomacra melanaria Bananal antbird, Cercomacra ferdinandi (E)
 Rio Branco antbird, Cercomacra carbonaria (critically endangered)
 Western fire-eye, Pyriglena maura 
 Tapajos fire-eye, Pyriglena similis (E)
 East Amazonian fire-eye, Pyriglena leuconota (E)
 Fringe-backed fire-eye, Pyriglena atra (E) (endangered)
 White-shouldered fire-eye, Pyriglena leucoptera Slender antbird, Rhopornis ardesiacus (E) (endangered)
 White-browed antbird, Myrmoborus leucophrys Ash-breasted antbird, Myrmoborus lugubris Black-faced antbird, Myrmoborus myotherinus Black-tailed antbird, Myrmoborus melanurus (vulnerable)
 White-lined antbird, Myrmoborus lophotes Black-chinned antbird, Hypocnemoides melanopogon Band-tailed antbird, Hypocnemoides maculicauda Black-and-white antbird, Myrmochanes hemileucus Silvered antbird, Sclateria naevia Black-headed antbird, Percnostola rufifrons Slate-colored antbird, Myrmelastes schistaceus Roraiman antbird, Myrmelastes saturatus Plumbeous antbird, Myrmelastes hyperythrus Spot-winged antbird, Myrmelastes leucostigma Humaita antbird, Myrmelastes humaythae Rufous-faced antbird, Myrmelastes rufifacies (E)
 Caura antbird, Myrmelastes caurensis White-bellied antbird, Myrmeciza longipes Chestnut-tailed antbird, Sciaphylax hemimelaena Ferruginous-backed antbird, Myrmoderus ferrugineus Scalloped antbird, Myrmoderus ruficauda (E) (endangered)
 White-bibbed antbird, Myrmoderus loricatus (E)
 Squamate antbird, Myrmoderus squamosus (E)
 White-shouldered antbird, Akletos melanoceps Goeldi's antbird, Akletos goeldii Sooty antbird, Hafferia fortis Yapacana antbird, Aprositornis disjuncta Black-throated antbird, Myrmophylax atrothorax Gray-bellied antbird, Ammonastes pelzelni Wing-banded antbird, Myrmornis torquata White-plumed antbird, Pithys albifrons White-cheeked antbird, Gymnopithys leucaspis Rufous-throated antbird, Gymnopithys rufigula White-throated antbird, Oncillornis salvini Bare-eyed antbird, Rhegmatorhina gymnops (E)
 Harlequin antbird, Rhegmatorhina berlepschi (E)
 White-breasted antbird, Rhegmatorhina hoffmannsi (E)
 Chestnut-crested antbird, Rhegmatorhina cristata Hairy-crested antbird, Rhegmatorhina melanosticta Spot-backed antbird, Hylophylax naevius Dot-backed antbird, Hylophylax punctulatus Common scale-backed antbird, Willisornis poecilinotus Xingu scale-backed antbird, Willisornis vidua (E)
 Black-spotted bare-eye, Phlegopsis nigromaculata Reddish-winged bare-eye, Phlegopsis erythroptera Pale-faced bare-eye, Phlegopsis borbae (E)

Crescentchests
Order: PasseriformesFamily: Melanopareiidae

These are smallish birds which inhabit regions of arid scrub. They have a band across the chest which gives them their name.

 Collared crescentchest, Melanopareia torquataGnateaters

Order: PasseriformesFamily: Conopophagidae

The gnateaters are round, short-tailed and long-legged birds, which are closely related to the antbirds.

 Black-bellied gnateater, Conopophaga melanogaster (E)
 Black-cheeked gnateater, Conopophaga melanops (E)
 Chestnut-belted gnateater, Conopophaga aurita Ash-throated gnateater, Conopophaga peruviana Ceara gnateater, Conopophaga cearae (E)
 Hooded gnateater, Conopophaga roberti (E)
 Rufous gnateater, Conopophaga lineataAntpittas
Order: PasseriformesFamily: Grallariidae

Antpittas resemble the true pittas with strong, longish legs, very short tails and stout bills.

 Variegated antpitta, Grallaria varia Scaled antpitta, Grallaria guatimalensis Elusive antpitta, Grallaria eludens Speckle-breasted antpitta, Cryptopezus nattereri Slate-crowned antpitta, Grallaricula nana White-browed antpitta, Hylopezus ochroleucus (E) (near-threatened)
 Spotted antpitta, Hylopezus macularius Alta Floresta antpitta, Hylopezus whittakeri (E)
 Snethlage's antpitta, Hylopezus paraensis (E)
 Amazonian antpitta, Myrmothera berlepschi Thrush-like antpitta, Myrmothera campanisona Tepui antpitta, Myrmothera simplex Tapajos antpitta, Myrmothera subcanescens (E)

Tapaculos
Order: PasseriformesFamily: Rhinocryptidae

The tapaculos are small suboscine passeriform birds with numerous species in South and Central America. They are terrestrial species that fly only poorly on their short wings. They have strong legs, well-suited to their habitat of grassland or forest undergrowth. The tail is cocked and pointed towards the head.

 Spotted bamboowren, Psilorhamphus guttatus (near-threatened)
 Rusty-belted tapaculo, Liosceles thoracicus Slaty bristlefront, Merulaxis ater (E) (near-threatened)
 Stresemann's bristlefront, Merulaxis stresemanni (E) (critically endangered)
 Bahia tapaculo, Eleoscytalopus psychopompus (E) (endangered)
 White-breasted tapaculo, Eleoscytalopus indigoticus (E) (near-threatened)
 Marsh tapaculo, Scytalopus iraiensis (E) (endangered)
 Diamantina tapaculo, Scytalopus diamantinensis (E)
 Brasilia tapaculo, Scytalopus novacapitalis (E) (near-threatened)
 Rock tapaculo, Scytalopus petrophilus (E)
 Planalto tapaculo, Scytalopus pachecoi Boa Nova tapaculo, Scytalopus gonzagai (E)
 Mouse-colored tapaculo, Scytalopus speluncae (E)

Antthrushes
Order: PasseriformesFamily: Formicariidae

Antthrushes resemble small rails. 

 Rufous-capped antthrush, Formicarius colma Black-faced antthrush, Formicarius analis Rufous-fronted antthrush, Formicarius rufifrons Short-tailed antthrush, Chamaeza campanisona Striated antthrush, Chamaeza nobilis Such's antthrush, Chamaeza meruloides (E)
 Rufous-tailed antthrush, Chamaeza ruficaudaOvenbirds

Order: PasseriformesFamily: Furnariidae

Ovenbirds comprise a large family of small sub-oscine passerine bird species found in Central and South America. They are a diverse group of insectivores which gets its name from the elaborate "oven-like" clay nests built by some species, although others build stick nests or nest in tunnels or clefts in rock. The woodcreepers are brownish birds which maintain an upright vertical posture, supported by their stiff tail vanes. They feed mainly on insects taken from tree trunks.

 South American leaftosser, Sclerurus obscurior Short-billed leaftosser, Sclerurus rufigularis Black-tailed leaftosser, Sclerurus caudacutus Gray-throated leaftosser, Sclerurus albigularis Rufous-breasted leaftosser, Sclerurus scansor Common miner, Geositta cunicularia Campo miner, Geositta poeciloptera (near-threatened)
 Spot-throated woodcreeper, Certhiasomus stictolaemus Olivaceous woodcreeper, Sittasomus griseicapillus Long-tailed woodcreeper, Deconychura longicauda White-chinned woodcreeper, Dendrocincla merula Plain-brown woodcreeper, Dendrocincla fuliginosa Plain-winged woodcreeper, Dendrocincla turdina Wedge-billed woodcreeper, Glyphorynchus spirurus Cinnamon-throated woodcreeper, Dendrexetastes rufigula Long-billed woodcreeper, Nasica longirostris Amazonian barred-woodcreeper, Dendrocolaptes certhia Black-banded woodcreeper, Dendrocolaptes picumnus Hoffmanns's woodcreeper, Dendrocolaptes hoffmannsi (E)
 Planalto woodcreeper, Dendrocolaptes platyrostris Bar-bellied woodcreeper, Hylexetastes stresemanni Red-billed woodcreeper, Hylexetastes perrotii Uniform woodcreeper, Hylexetastes uniformis Strong-billed woodcreeper, Xiphocolaptes promeropirhynchus Moustached woodcreeper, Xiphocolaptes falcirostris (E) (vulnerable)
 White-throated woodcreeper, Xiphocolaptes albicollis Great rufous woodcreeper, Xiphocolaptes major Striped woodcreeper, Xiphorhynchus obsoletus Ceara woodcreeper, Xiphorhynchus atlanticus (E)
 Lesser woodcreeper, Xiphorhynchus fuscus Chestnut-rumped woodcreeper, Xiphorhynchus pardalotus Ocellated woodcreeper, Xiphorhynchus ocellatus Elegant woodcreeper, Xiphorhynchus elegans Spix's woodcreeper, Xiphorhynchus spixii (E)
 Buff-throated woodcreeper, Xiphorhynchus guttatus Straight-billed woodcreeper, Dendroplex picus Zimmer's woodcreeper, Dendroplex kienerii Red-billed scythebill, Campylorhamphus trochilirostris Black-billed scythebill, Campylorhamphus falcularius Curve-billed scythebill, Campylorhamphus procurvoides Scimitar-billed woodcreeper, Drymornis bridgesii Streak-headed woodcreeper, Lepidocolaptes souleyetii Narrow-billed woodcreeper, Lepidocolaptes angustirostris Scaled woodcreeper, Lepidocolaptes squamatus (E)
 Scalloped woodcreeper, Lepidocolaptes falcinellus Duida woodcreeper, Lepidocolaptes duidae Guianan woodcreeper, Lepidocolaptes albolineatus Inambari woodcreeper, Lepidocolaptes fatimalimae Dusky-capped woodcreeper, Lepidocolaptes fuscicapillus Slender-billed xenops, Xenops tenuirostris Plain xenops, Xenops minutus Streaked xenops, Xenops rutilans Point-tailed palmcreeper, Berlepschia rikeri Rufous-tailed xenops, Microxenops milleri Chaco earthcreeper, Tarphonomus certhioides (V)
 Wing-banded hornero, Furnarius figulus (E)
 Pale-legged hornero, Furnarius leucopus Pale-billed hornero, Furnarius torridus Lesser hornero, Furnarius minor Rufous hornero, Furnarius rufus Sharp-tailed streamcreeper, Lochmias nematura Wren-like rushbird, Phleocryptes melanops Curve-billed reedhaunter, Limnornis curvirostris Long-tailed cinclodes, Cinclodes pabsti (E)
 Buff-winged cinclodes, Cinclodes fuscus Dusky-cheeked foliage-gleaner, Anabazenops dorsalis White-collared foliage-gleaner, Anabazenops fuscus (E)
 Great xenops, Megaxenops parnaguae (E)
 Pale-browed treehunter, Cichlocolaptes leucophrus (E)
 Cryptic treehunter, Cichlocolaptes mazarbarnetti (E) (critically endangered) (First described in 2014. Not evaluated by the SACC; a proposal is pending. Not included in counts.)http://www.museum.lsu.edu/~Remsen/SACCproproster.htm SACC Proposal Roster
 Sharp-billed treehunter, Heliobletus contaminatus Rufous-rumped foliage-gleaner, Philydor erythrocercum Alagoas foliage-gleaner, Philydor novaesi (E) (extinct)
 Black-capped foliage-gleaner, Philydor atricapillus Cinnamon-rumped foliage-gleaner, Philydor pyrrhodes Rufous-tailed foliage-gleaner, Anabacerthia ruficaudata White-browed foliage-gleaner, Anabacerthia amaurotis (near-threatened)
 Ochre-breasted foliage-gleaner, Anabacerthia lichtensteini Buff-browed foliage-gleaner, Syndactyla rufosuperciliata Russet-mantled foliage-gleaner, Syndactyla dimidiata White-throated foliage-gleaner, Syndactyla roraimae Peruvian recurvebill, Syndactyla ucayalae (near-threatened)
 Chestnut-winged hookbill, Ancistrops strigilatus Buff-fronted foliage-gleaner, Dendroma rufa Chestnut-winged foliage-gleaner, Dendroma erythroptera Chestnut-capped foliage-gleaner, Clibanornis rectirostris Canebrake groundcreeper, Clibanornis dendrocolaptoides (near-threatened)
 Ruddy foliage-gleaner, Clibanornis rubiginosus Chestnut-crowned foliage-gleaner, Automolus rufipileatus Brown-rumped foliage-gleaner, Automolus melanopezus Buff-throated foliage-gleaner, Automolus ochrolaemus Striped woodhaunter, Automolus subulatus Olive-backed foliage-gleaner, Automolus infuscatus Para foliage-gleaner, Automolus paraensis (E)
 Pernambuco foliage-gleaner, Automolus lammi (E)
 White-eyed foliage-gleaner, Automolus leucophthalmus Tufted tit-spinetail, Leptasthenura platensis Striolated tit-spinetail, Leptasthenura striolata (E)
 Araucaria tit-spinetail, Leptasthenura setaria (near-threatened)
 Rufous-fronted thornbird, Phacellodomus rufifrons Little thornbird, Phacellodomus sibilatrix Freckle-breasted thornbird, Phacellodomus striaticollis Greater thornbird, Phacellodomus ruber Orange-eyed thornbird, Phacellodomus erythrophthalmus (E)
 Orange-breasted thornbird, Phacellodomus ferrugineigula Firewood-gatherer, Anumbius annumbi Lark-like brushrunner, Coryphistera alaudina Short-billed canastero, Asthenes baeri Cipo canastero, Asthenes luizae (E)
 Hudson's canastero, Asthenes hudsoni Itatiaia spinetail, Asthenes moreirae (E)
 Sharp-billed canastero, Asthenes pyrrholeuca (V)
 Pink-legged graveteiro, Acrobatornis fonsecai (E) (vulnerable)
 Orange-fronted plushcrown, Metopothrix aurantiaca Roraiman barbtail, Roraimia adusta Striated softtail, Thripophaga macroura (E) (vulnerable)
 Plain softtail, Thripophaga fusciceps Straight-billed reedhaunter, Limnoctites rectirostris (near-threatened)
 Sulphur-bearded reedhaunter, Limnoctites sulphuriferus Rusty-backed spinetail, Cranioleuca vulpina Parker's spinetail, Cranioleuca vulpecula Stripe-crowned spinetail, Cranioleuca pyrrhophia Olive spinetail, Cranioleuca obsoleta Pallid spinetail, Cranioleuca pallida (E)
 Gray-headed spinetail, Cranioleuca semicinerea (E)
 Tepui spinetail, Cranioleuca demissa Speckled spinetail, Cranioleuca gutturata Scaled spinetail, Cranioleuca muelleri (E)
 Bay-capped wren-spinetail, Spartonoica maluroides (near-threatened)
 Caatinga cacholote, Pseudoseisura cristata (E)
 Rufous cacholote, Pseudoseisura unirufa Brown cacholote, Pseudoseisura lophotes Yellow-chinned spinetail, Certhiaxis cinnamomeus Red-and-white spinetail, Certhiaxis mustelinus White-bellied spinetail, Mazaria propinqua Chotoy spinetail, Schoeniophylax phryganophilus Ochre-cheeked spinetail, Synallaxis scutata Gray-bellied spinetail, Synallaxis cinerascens Plain-crowned spinetail, Synallaxis gujanensis White-lored spinetail, Synallaxis albilora Red-shouldered spinetail, Synallaxis hellmayri (E)
 Rufous-capped spinetail, Synallaxis ruficapilla Bahia spinetail, Synallaxis cinerea (E) (near-threatened)
 Pinto's spinetail, Synallaxis infuscata (E) (endangered)
 McConnell's spinetail, Synallaxis macconnelli Cabanis's spinetail, Synallaxis cabanisi Cinereous-breasted spinetail, Synallaxis hypospodia Spix's spinetail, Synallaxis spixi Dark-breasted spinetail, Synallaxis albigularis Pale-breasted spinetail, Synallaxis albescens Sooty-fronted spinetail, Synallaxis frontalis Hoary-throated spinetail, Synallaxis kollari (critically endangered)
 Ruddy spinetail, Synallaxis rutilans Chestnut-throated spinetail, Synallaxis cherriei (near-threatened)

Manakins

Order: PasseriformesFamily: Pipridae

The manakins are a family of subtropical and tropical mainland Central and South America, and Trinidad and Tobago. They are compact forest birds, the males typically being brightly colored, although the females of most species are duller and usually green-plumaged. Manakins feed on small fruits, berries and insects.

 Dwarf tyrant-manakin, Tyranneutes stolzmanni Tiny tyrant-manakin, Tyranneutes virescens Pale-bellied tyrant-manakin, Neopelma pallescens Saffron-crested tyrant-manakin, Neopelma chrysocephalum Wied's tyrant-manakin, Neopelma aurifrons (E)
 Serra do Mar tyrant-manakin, Neopelma chrysolophum (E)
 Sulphur-bellied tyrant-manakin, Neopelma sulphureiventer Araripe manakin, Antilophia bokermanni (E) (critically endangered)
 Helmeted manakin, Antilophia galeata Blue-backed manakin, Chiroxiphia pareola Swallow-tailed manakin, Chiroxiphia caudata Pin-tailed manakin, Ilicura militaris (E)
 White-throated manakin, Corapipo gutturalis Olive manakin, Xenopipo uniformis Black manakin, Xenopipo atronitens Blue-capped manakin, Lepidothrix coronata Snow-capped manakin, Lepidothrix nattereri Golden-crowned manakin, Lepidothrix vilasboasi (E) (vulnerable)
 Opal-crowned manakin, Lepidothrix iris (E)
 Orange-bellied manakin, Lepidothrix suavissima White-fronted manakin, Lepidothrix serena Orange-crowned manakin, Heterocercus aurantiivertex Yellow-crowned manakin, Heterocercus flavivertex Flame-crowned manakin, Heterocercus linteatus White-bearded manakin, Manacus manacus Crimson-hooded manakin, Pipra aureola Wire-tailed manakin, Pipra filicauda Band-tailed manakin, Pipra fasciicauda Striolated manakin, Machaeropterus striolatus Kinglet manakin, Machaeropterus regulus (E)
 Fiery-capped manakin, Machaeropterus pyrocephalus White-crowned manakin, Pseudopipra pipra Scarlet-horned manakin, Ceratopipra cornuta Golden-headed manakin, Ceratopipra erythrocephala Red-headed manakin, Ceratopipra rubrocapilla Round-tailed manakin, Ceratopipra chloromerosCotingas

Order: PasseriformesFamily: Cotingidae

The cotingas are birds of forests or forest edges in tropical South America. Comparatively little is known about this diverse group, although all have broad bills with hooked tips, rounded wings, and strong legs. The males of many of the species are brightly colored or decorated with plumes or wattles.

 Hooded berryeater, Carpornis cucullatus (E) (near-threatened)
 Black-headed berryeater, Carpornis melanocephalus (E) (vulnerable)
 Red-banded fruiteater, Pipreola whitelyi White-tipped plantcutter, Phytotoma rutila (V)
 Swallow-tailed cotinga, Phibalura flavirostris (near-threatened)
 Guianan red-cotinga, Phoenicircus carnifex Black-necked red-cotinga, Phoenicircus nigricollis Guianan cock-of-the-rock, Rupicola rupicola Crimson fruitcrow, Haematoderus militaris Purple-throated fruitcrow, Querula purpurata Red-ruffed fruitcrow, Pyroderus scutatus Amazonian umbrellabird, Cephalopterus ornatus Capuchinbird, Perissocephalus tricolor Plum-throated cotinga, Cotinga maynana Purple-breasted cotinga, Cotinga cotinga Banded cotinga, Cotinga maculata (E) (endangered)
 Spangled cotinga, Cotinga cayana Rose-collared piha, Lipaugus streptophorus Screaming piha, Lipaugus vociferans Cinnamon-vented piha, Lipaugus lanioides (E) (near-threatened)
 Black-and-gold cotinga, Lipaugus ater (E) (near-threatened)
 Gray-winged cotinga, Lipaugus conditus (E) (vulnerable)
 White bellbird, Procnias alba Bearded bellbird, Procnias averano Bare-throated bellbird, Procnias nudicollis (vulnerable)
 Purple-throated cotinga, Porphyrolaema porphyrolaema Pompadour cotinga, Xipholena punicea White-tailed cotinga, Xipholena lamellipennis (E)
 White-winged cotinga, Xipholena atropurpurea (E) (vulnerable)
 Bare-necked fruitcrow, Gymnoderus foetidus Black-faced cotinga, Conioptilon mcilhennyiTityras

Order: PasseriformesFamily: Tityridae

Tityridae are suboscine passerine birds found in forest and woodland in the Neotropics. The species in this family were formerly spread over the families Tyrannidae, Pipridae, and Cotingidae. They are small to medium-sized birds. They do not have the sophisticated vocal capabilities of the songbirds. Most, but not all, have plain coloring.

 Black-crowned tityra, Tityra inquisitor Black-tailed tityra, Tityra cayana Masked tityra, Tityra semifasciata Varzea schiffornis, Schiffornis major Olivaceous schiffornis, Schiffornis olivacea Brown-winged schiffornis, Schiffornis turdina Greenish schiffornis, Schiffornis virescens Cinereous mourner, Laniocera hypopyrra White-browed purpletuft, Iodopleura isabellae Dusky purpletuft, Iodopleura fusca Buff-throated purpletuft, Iodopleura pipra (E) (endangered)
 Shrike-like cotinga, Laniisoma elegans (near-threatened)
 White-naped xenopsaris, Xenopsaris albinucha Green-backed becard, Pachyramphus viridis Cinereous becard, Pachyramphus rufus Chestnut-crowned becard, Pachyramphus castaneus White-winged becard, Pachyramphus polychopterus Black-capped becard, Pachyramphus marginatus Glossy-backed becard, Pachyramphus surinamus Pink-throated becard, Pachyramphus minor Crested becard, Pachyramphus validusSharpbill
Order: PasseriformesFamily: Oxyruncidae

The sharpbill is a small bird of dense forests in Central and South America. It feeds mostly on fruit but also eats insects.

 Sharpbill, Oxyruncus cristatusRoyal flycatchers
Order: PasseriformesFamily: Onychorhynchidae

In 2019 the SACC determined that these five species, which were formerly considered tyrant flycatchers, belonged in their own family.

 Royal flycatcher, Onychorhynchus coronatus Ruddy-tailed flycatcher, Terenotriccus erythrurus Sulphur-rumped flycatcher, Myiobius barbatus Black-tailed flycatcher, Myiobius atricaudusTyrant flycatchers
Order: PasseriformesFamily: Tyrannidae

Tyrant flycatchers are passerine birds which occur throughout North and South America. They superficially resemble the Old World flycatchers, but are more robust and have stronger bills. They do not have the sophisticated vocal capabilities of the songbirds. Most, but not all, have plain coloring. As the name implies, most are insectivorous.

 Wing-barred piprites, Piprites chloris Black-capped piprites, Piprites pileata Kinglet calyptura, Calyptura cristata (E)
 Cinnamon manakin-tyrant, Neopipo cinnamomea Cinnamon-crested spadebill, Platyrinchus saturatus White-throated spadebill, Platyrinchus mystaceus Golden-crowned spadebill, Platyrinchus coronatus White-crested spadebill, Platyrinchus platyrhynchos Russet-winged spadebill, Platyrinchus leucoryphus Ringed antpipit, Corythopis torquatus Southern antpipit, Corythopis delalandi Chapman's bristle-tyrant, Phylloscartes chapmani Southern bristle-tyrant, Phylloscartes eximius Mottle-cheeked tyrannulet, Phylloscartes ventralis Restinga tyrannulet, Phylloscartes kronei (E)
 Bahia tyrannulet, Phylloscartes beckeri (E)
 Olive-green tyrannulet, Phylloscartes virescens Black-fronted tyrannulet, Phylloscartes nigrifrons Alagoas tyrannulet, Phylloscartes ceciliae (E)
 Minas Gerais tyrannulet, Phylloscartes roquettei (E)
 São Paulo tyrannulet, Phylloscartes paulista Oustalet's tyrannulet, Phylloscartes oustaleti (E)
 Serra do Mar tyrannulet, Phylloscartes difficilis (E)
 Bay-ringed tyrannulet, Phylloscartes sylviolus Ochre-bellied flycatcher, Mionectes oleagineus McConnell's flycatcher, Mionectes macconnelli Sierra de Lema flycatcher, Mionectes roraimae Gray-hooded flycatcher, Mionectes rufiventris Sepia-capped flycatcher, Leptopogon amaurocephalus Black-chested tyrant, Taeniotriccus andrei Brownish twistwing, Cnipodectes subbrunneus Rufous twistwing, Cnipodectes superrufus Olivaceous flatbill, Rhynchocyclus olivaceus Yellow-olive flycatcher, Tolmomyias sulphurescens Yellow-margined flycatcher, Tolmomyias assimilis Gray-crowned flycatcher, Tolmomyias poliocephalus Yellow-breasted flycatcher, Tolmomyias flaviventris Eared pygmy-tyrant, Myiornis auricularis Short-tailed pygmy-tyrant, Myiornis ecaudatus Double-banded pygmy-tyrant, Lophotriccus vitiosus Long-crested pygmy-tyrant, Lophotriccus eulophotes Helmeted pygmy-tyrant, Lophotriccus galeatus Pale-eyed pygmy-tyrant, Atalotriccus pilaris Snethlage's tody-tyrant, Hemitriccus minor Acre tody-tyrant, Hemitriccus cohnhafti Flammulated pygmy-tyrant, Hemitriccus flammulatus Drab-breasted pygmy-tyrant, Hemitriccus diops Brown-breasted pygmy-tyrant, Hemitriccus obsoletus Boat-billed tody-tyrant, Hemitriccus josephinae White-eyed tody-tyrant, Hemitriccus zosterops White-bellied tody-tyrant, Hemitriccus griseipectus Eye-ringed tody-tyrant, Hemitriccus orbitatus (E)
 Johannes's tody-tyrant, Hemitriccus iohannis Stripe-necked tody-tyrant, Hemitriccus striaticollis Hangnest tody-tyrant, Hemitriccus nidipendulus (E)
 Pearly-vented tody-tyrant, Hemitriccus margaritaceiventer Pelzeln's tody-tyrant, Hemitriccus inornatus Zimmer's tody-tyrant, Hemitriccus minimus Buff-breasted tody-tyrant, Hemitriccus mirandae (E)
 Kaempfer's tody-tyrant, Hemitriccus kaempferi (E)
 Fork-tailed pygmy-tyrant, Hemitriccus furcatus (E)
 White-cheeked tody-flycatcher, Poecilotriccus albifacies Black-and-white tody-flycatcher, Poecilotriccus capitalis Buff-cheeked tody-flycatcher, Poecilotriccus senex (E)
 Ruddy tody-flycatcher, Poecilotriccus russatus Ochre-faced tody-flycatcher, Poecilotriccus plumbeiceps Smoky-fronted tody-flycatcher, Poecilotriccus fumifrons Rusty-fronted tody-flycatcher, Poecilotriccus latirostris Slate-headed tody-flycatcher, Poecilotriccus sylvia Spotted tody-flycatcher, Todirostrum maculatum Gray-headed tody-flycatcher, Todirostrum poliocephalum (E)
 Common tody-flycatcher, Todirostrum cinereum Painted tody-flycatcher, Todirostrum pictum Yellow-browed tody-flycatcher, Todirostrum chrysocrotaphum Cliff flycatcher, Hirundinea ferruginea Chico's tyrannulet, Zimmerius chicomendesi (E)
 Slender-footed tyrannulet, Zimmerius gracilipes Guianan tyrannulet, Zimmerius acer Lesser wagtail-tyrant, Stigmatura napensis Greater wagtail-tyrant, Stigmatura budytoides Plain tyrannulet, Inezia inornata Amazonian tyrannulet, Inezia subflava Pale-tipped tyrannulet, Inezia caudata Fulvous-crowned scrub-tyrant, Euscarthmus meloryphus Rufous-sided scrub-tyrant, Euscarthmus rufomarginatus White-lored tyrannulet, Ornithion inerme Southern beardless-tyrannulet, Camptostoma obsoletum Yellow-bellied elaenia, Elaenia flavogaster Large elaenia, Elaenia spectabilis Noronha elaenia, Elaenia ridleyana (E)
 White-crested elaenia, Elaenia albiceps Small-billed elaenia, Elaenia parvirostris Olivaceous elaenia, Elaenia mesoleuca Brownish elaenia, Elaenia pelzelni Plain-crested elaenia, Elaenia cristata Lesser elaenia, Elaenia chiriquensis Rufous-crowned elaenia, Elaenia ruficeps Tepui elaenia, Elaenia olivina Great elaenia, Elaenia dayi Small-headed elaenia, Elaenia sordida Yellow-crowned tyrannulet, Tyrannulus elatus Forest elaenia, Myiopagis gaimardii Gray elaenia, Myiopagis caniceps Yellow-crowned elaenia, Myiopagis flavivertex Greenish elaenia, Myiopagis viridicata Suiriri flycatcher, Suiriri suiriri Yellow tyrannulet, Capsiempis flaveola Rough-legged tyrannulet, Phyllomyias burmeisteri Greenish tyrannulet, Phyllomyias virescens Reiser's tyrannulet, Phyllomyias reiseri Yungas tyrannulet, Phyllomyias weedeni Planalto tyrannulet, Phyllomyias fasciatus Sooty-headed tyrannulet, Phyllomyias griseiceps Gray-capped tyrannulet, Phyllomyias griseocapilla (E)
 Mouse-colored tyrannulet, Phaeomyias murina White-throated tyrannulet, Mecocerculus leucophrys Bearded tachuri, Polystictus pectoralis Gray-backed tachuri, Polystictus superciliaris (E)
 Sharp-tailed tyrant, Culicivora caudacuta Crested doradito, Pseudocolopteryx sclateri Subtropical doradito, Pseudocolopteryx acutipennis Dinelli's doradito, Pseudocolopteryx dinelliana (H)
 Warbling doradito, Pseudocolopteryx flaviventris River tyrannulet, Serpophaga hypoleuca Sooty tyrannulet, Serpophaga nigricans White-crested tyrannulet, Serpophaga subcristata White-bellied tyrannulet, Serpophaga munda Straneck's tyrannulet, Serpophaga griseicapilla Rufous-tailed attila, Attila phoenicurus Cinnamon attila, Attila cinnamomeus Citron-bellied attila, Attila citriniventris Dull-capped attila, Attila bolivianus Gray-hooded attila, Attila rufus (E)
 Bright-rumped attila, Attila spadiceus Piratic flycatcher, Legatus leucophaius Large-headed flatbill, Ramphotrigon megacephalum Rufous-tailed flatbill, Ramphotrigon ruficauda Dusky-tailed flatbill, Ramphotrigon fuscicauda Great kiskadee, Pitangus sulphuratus Lesser kiskadee, Philohydor lictor Cattle tyrant, Machetornis rixosa Sulphury flycatcher, Tyrannopsis sulphurea Boat-billed flycatcher, Megarynchus pitangua Sulphur-bellied flycatcher, Myiodynastes luteiventris (V)
 Streaked flycatcher, Myiodynastes maculatus Rusty-margined flycatcher, Myiozetetes cayanensis Social flycatcher, Myiozetetes similis Gray-capped flycatcher, Myiozetetes granadensis Dusky-chested flycatcher, Myiozetetes luteiventris Yellow-throated flycatcher, Conopias parvus Three-striped flycatcher, Conopias trivirgatus Variegated flycatcher, Empidonomus varius Crowned slaty flycatcher, Empidonomus aurantioatrocristatus White-throated kingbird, Tyrannus albogularis Tropical kingbird, Tyrannus melancholicus Fork-tailed flycatcher, Tyrannus savana Eastern kingbird, Tyrannus tyrannus Gray kingbird, Tyrannus dominicensis (V)
 Grayish mourner, Rhytipterna simplex Pale-bellied mourner, Rhytipterna immunda Rufous casiornis, Casiornis rufus Ash-throated casiornis, Casiornis fuscus (E)
 White-rumped sirystes, Sirystes albocinereus Todd's sirystes, Sirystes subcanescens Sibilant sirystes, Sirystes sibilator Dusky-capped flycatcher, Myiarchus tuberculifer Swainson's flycatcher, Myiarchus swainsoni Short-crested flycatcher, Myiarchus ferox Brown-crested flycatcher, Myiarchus tyrannulus Long-tailed tyrant, Colonia colonus Roraiman flycatcher, Myiophobus roraimae Bran-colored flycatcher, Myiophobus fasciatus Chapada flycatcher, Guyramemua affinis Amazonian scrub-flycatcher, Sublegatus obscurior Southern scrub-flycatcher, Sublegatus modestus Vermilion flycatcher, Pyrocephalus rubinus Pied water-tyrant, Fluvicola pica Black-backed water-tyrant, Fluvicola albiventer Masked water-tyrant, Fluvicola nengeta White-headed marsh tyrant, Arundinicola leucocephala Streamer-tailed tyrant, Gubernetes yetapa Black-and-white monjita, Heteroxolmis dominicanus Cock-tailed tyrant, Alectrurus tricolor Strange-tailed tyrant, Alectrurus risora (V)
 Austral negrito, Lessonia rufa Spectacled tyrant, Hymenops perspicillatus Riverside tyrant, Knipolegus orenocensis Rufous-tailed tyrant, Knipolegus poecilurus Amazonian black-tyrant, Knipolegus poecilocercus Caatinga black-tyrant, Knipolegus franciscanus (E)
 Crested black-tyrant, Knipolegus lophotes Velvety black-tyrant, Knipolegus nigerrimus (E)
 Blue-billed black-tyrant, Knipolegus cyanirostris Cinereous tyrant, Knipolegus striaticeps (V)
 White-winged black-tyrant, Knipolegus aterrimus (V)
 Hudson's black-tyrant, Knipolegus hudsoni (V)
 Yellow-browed tyrant, Satrapa icterophrys Little ground-tyrant, Muscisaxicola fluviatilis Spot-billed ground-tyrant, Muscisaxicola maculirostris (V)
 Dark-faced ground-tyrant, Muscisaxicola maclovianus (V)
 Cinnamon-bellied ground-tyrant, Muscisaxicola capistratus (V)
 White-rumped monjita, Xolmis velatus White monjita, Xolmis irupero Gray monjita, Nengetus cinereus Black-crowned monjita, Neoxolmis coronatus Chocolate-vented tyrant, Neoxolmis rufiventris (V)
 Rusty-backed monjita, Neoxolmis rubetra (V)
 Gray-bellied shrike-tyrant, Agriornis micropterus (V)
 Lesser shrike-tyrant, Agriornis murinus (V)
 Drab water tyrant, Ochthornis littoralis Fuscous flycatcher, Cnemotriccus fuscatus Euler's flycatcher, Lathrotriccus euleri Alder flycatcher, Empidonax alnorum Olive-sided flycatcher, Contopus cooperi Smoke-colored pewee, Contopus fumigatus Western wood-pewee, Contopus sordidulus (V)
 Eastern wood-pewee, Contopus virens Tropical pewee, Contopus cinereus White-throated pewee, Contopus albogularis Blackish pewee, Contopus nigrescens Shear-tailed gray tyrant, Muscipipra vetula Many-colored rush tyrant, Tachuris rubrigastraVireos

Order: PasseriformesFamily: Vireonidae

The vireos are a group of small to medium-sized passerine birds. They are typically greenish in color and resemble wood warblers apart from their heavier bills.

 Rufous-browed peppershrike, Cyclarhis gujanensis Gray-eyed greenlet, Hylophilus amaurocephalus (E)
 Rufous-crowned greenlet, Hylophilus poicilotis Ashy-headed greenlet, Hylophilus pectoralis Gray-chested greenlet, Hylophilus semicinereus Brown-headed greenlet, Hylophilus brunneiceps Lemon-chested greenlet, Hylophilus thoracicus Slaty-capped shrike-vireo, Vireolanius leucotis Tawny-crowned greenlet, Tunchiornis ochraceiceps Dusky-capped greenlet, Pachysylvia hypoxantha Buff-cheeked greenlet, Pachysylvia muscicapina Tepui vireo, Vireo sclateri Red-eyed vireo, Vireo olivaceus Chivi vireo, Vireo chivi Noronha vireo, Vireo gracilirostris (E) (near-threatened)
 Yellow-green vireo, Vireo flavoviridis Black-whiskered vireo, Vireo altiloquusJays

Order: PasseriformesFamily: Corvidae

The family Corvidae includes crows, ravens, jays, choughs, magpies, treepies, nutcrackers, and ground jays. Corvids are above average in size among the Passeriformes, and some of the larger species show high levels of intelligence.

 Violaceous jay, Cyanocorax violaceus Purplish jay, Cyanocorax cyanomelas Azure jay, Cyanocorax caeruleus (near-threatened)
 Curl-crested jay, Cyanocorax cristatellus Cayenne jay, Cyanocorax cayanus Azure-naped jay, Cyanocorax heilprini Plush-crested jay, Cyanocorax chrysops White-naped jay, Cyanocorax cyanopogon (E)

Swallows

Order: PasseriformesFamily: Hirundinidae

The family Hirundinidae is adapted to aerial feeding. They have a slender streamlined body, long pointed wings, and a short bill with a wide gape. The feet are adapted to perching rather than walking, and the front toes are partially joined at the base.

 Blue-and-white swallow, Pygochelidon cyanoleuca Black-collared swallow, Pygochelidon melanoleuca Tawny-headed swallow, Alopochelidon fucata White-banded swallow, Atticora fasciata White-thighed swallow, Atticora tibialis Southern rough-winged swallow, Stelgidopteryx ruficollis Brown-chested martin, Progne tapera Purple martin, Progne subis Caribbean martin, Progne dominicensis (V)
 Cuban martin, Progne cryptoleuca (V)
 Gray-breasted martin, Progne chalybea Southern martin, Progne elegans White-winged swallow, Tachycineta albiventer White-rumped swallow, Tachycineta leucorrhoa Chilean swallow, Tachycineta leucopyga Bank swallow, Riparia riparia Barn swallow, Hirundo rustica Cliff swallow, Petrochelidon pyrrhonotaWrens

Order: PasseriformesFamily: Troglodytidae

The wrens are mainly small and inconspicuous except for their loud songs. These birds have short wings and thin down-turned bills. Several species often hold their tails upright. All are insectivorous.

 Scaly-breasted wren, Microcerculus marginatus Flutist wren, Microcerculus ustulatus Wing-banded wren, Microcerculus bambla Tooth-billed wren, Odontorchilus cinereus House wren, Troglodytes aedon Tepui wren, Troglodytes rufulus Grass wren, Cistothorus platensis Bicolored wren, Campylorhynchus griseus Thrush-like wren, Campylorhynchus turdinus Moustached wren, Pheugopedius genibarbis Coraya wren, Pheugopedius coraya Buff-breasted wren, Cantorchilus leucotis Long-billed wren, Cantorchilus longirostris (E)
 Fawn-breasted wren, Cantorchilus guarayanus Gray wren, Cantorchilus griseus (E)
 White-breasted wood-wren, Henicorhina leucosticta Musician wren, Cyphorhinus aradusGnatcatchers
Order: PasseriformesFamily: Polioptilidae

These dainty birds resemble Old World warblers in their build and habits, moving restlessly through the foliage seeking insects. The gnatcatchers and gnatwrens are mainly soft bluish gray in color and have the typical insectivore's long sharp bill. They are birds of fairly open woodland or scrub, which nest in bushes or trees.

 Collared gnatwren, Microbates collaris Trilling gnatwren, Ramphocaenus melanurus Chattering gnatwren, Ramphocaenus sticturus Tropical gnatcatcher, Polioptila plumbea Rio Negro gnatcatcher, Polioptila facilis Creamy-bellied gnatcatcher, Polioptila lactea (near-threatened)
 Guianan gnatcatcher, Polioptila guianensis Klages's gnatcatcher, Polioptila paraensis Inambari gnatcatcher, Polioptila attenboroughi (E)
 Masked gnatcatcher, Polioptila dumicolaDonacobius
Order: PasseriformesFamily: Donacobiidae

The black-capped donacobius is found in wet habitats from Panama across northern South America and east of the Andes to Argentina and Paraguay.

 Black-capped donacobius Donacobius atricapillaThrushes

Order: PasseriformesFamily: Turdidae

The thrushes are a group of passerine birds that occur mainly in the Old World. They are plump, soft plumaged, small to medium-sized insectivores or sometimes omnivores, often feeding on the ground. Many have attractive songs.

 Orange-billed nightingale-thrush, Catharus aurantiirostris Veery, Catharus fuscescens Gray-cheeked thrush, Catharus minimus Swainson's thrush, Catharus ustulatus Rufous-brown solitaire, Cichlopsis leucogenys Pale-eyed thrush, Turdus leucops Yellow-legged thrush, Turdus flavipes Pale-breasted thrush, Turdus leucomelas Cocoa thrush, Turdus fumigatus Hauxwell's thrush, Turdus hauxwelli Rufous-bellied thrush, Turdus rufiventris Spectacled thrush, Turdus nudigenis Varzea thrush, Turdus sanchezorum Lawrence's thrush, Turdus lawrencii Pantepui thrush, Turdus murinus 
 Creamy-bellied thrush, Turdus amaurochalinus Black-billed thrush, Turdus ignobilis Campina thrush, Turdus arthuri Black-hooded thrush, Turdus olivater Blacksmith thrush, Turdus subalaris White-necked thrush, Turdus albicollisMockingbirds

Order: PasseriformesFamily: Mimidae

The mimids are a family of passerine birds that includes thrashers, mockingbirds, tremblers, and the New World catbirds. These birds are notable for their vocalizations, especially their ability to mimic a wide variety of birds and other sounds heard outdoors. Their coloring tends towards dull-grays and browns.

 Tropical mockingbird, Mimus gilvus Chalk-browed mockingbird, Mimus saturninus White-banded mockingbird, Mimus triurusStarlings
Order: PasseriformesFamily: Sturnidae

Starlings are small to medium-sized passerine birds. Their flight is strong and direct and they are very gregarious. Their preferred habitat is fairly open country. They eat insects and fruit. Plumage is typically dark with a metallic sheen.

 European starling, Sturnus vulgaris (I)

Estreldids

Order: PasseriformesFamily: Estrildidae

The estrildid finches are small passerine birds of the Old World tropics and Australasia. They are gregarious and often colonial seed eaters with short thick but pointed bills. They are all similar in structure and habits, but have wide variation in plumage colours and patterns.

 Common waxbill, Estrilda astrild (I)

Old World sparrows
Order: PasseriformesFamily: Passeridae

Old World sparrows are small passerine birds. In general, sparrows tend to be small, plump, brown or grey birds with short tails and short powerful beaks. Old World sparrow are seed eaters, but they also consume small insects.

 House sparrow, Passer domesticus (I)

Pipits and wagtails
Order: PasseriformesFamily: Motacillidae

Motacillidae is a family of small passerine birds with medium to long tails. They include the wagtails, longclaws and pipits. They are slender, ground feeding insectivores of open country.

 Yellowish pipit, Anthus chii Short-billed pipit, Anthus furcatus Correndera pipit, Anthus correndera Ochre-breasted pipit, Anthus nattereri (vulnerable)
 Hellmayr's pipit, Anthus hellmayriFinches

Order: PasseriformesFamily: Fringillidae

Finches are seed-eating passerine birds, that are small to moderately large and have a strong beak, usually conical and in some species very large. All have twelve tail feathers and nine primaries. These birds have a bouncing flight with alternating bouts of flapping and gliding on closed wings, and most sing well.

 European greenfinch, Chloris chloris (H)
 European goldfinch, Carduelis carduelis, (I)
 Yellow-faced siskin, Spinus yarrellii (E) (vulnerable)
 Hooded siskin, Spinus magellanicus Golden-rumped euphonia, Chlorophonia cyanocephala Blue-naped chlorophonia, Chlorophonia cyanea Plumbeous euphonia, Euphonia plumbea Purple-throated euphonia, Euphonia chlorotica Finsch's euphonia, Euphonia finschi Golden-bellied euphonia, Euphonia chrysopasta White-vented euphonia, Euphonia minuta Green-throated euphonia, Euphonia chalybea (near-threatened)
 Violaceous euphonia, Euphonia violacea Thick-billed euphonia, Euphonia laniirostris Orange-bellied euphonia, Euphonia xanthogaster Golden-sided euphonia, Euphonia cayennensis Rufous-bellied euphonia, Euphonia rufiventris Chestnut-bellied euphonia, Euphonia pectoralisSparrows

Order: PasseriformesFamily: Passerellidae

Most of the species are known as sparrows, but these birds are not closely related to the Old World sparrows which are in the family Passeridae. Many of these have distinctive head patterns.

 Grassland sparrow, Ammodramus humeralis Yellow-browed sparrow, Ammodramus aurifrons Black-striped sparrow, Arremonops conirostris Pectoral sparrow, Arremon taciturnus São Francisco sparrow, Arremon franciscanus (E)
 Half-collared sparrow, Arremon semitorquatus (E)
 Saffron-billed sparrow, Arremon flavirostris Rufous-collared sparrow, Zonotrichia capensis Tepui brushfinch, Atlapetes personatusBlackbirds
Order: PasseriformesFamily: Icteridae

The icterids are a group of small to medium-sized, often colorful, passerine birds restricted to the New World and include the grackles, New World blackbirds and New World orioles. Most species have black as the predominant plumage color, often enlivened by yellow, orange, or red.

 Bobolink, Dolichonyx oryzivorus Eastern meadowlark, Sturnella magna Red-breasted meadowlark, Leistes militaris White-browed meadowlark, Leistes superciliaris Pampas meadowlark, Leistes defilippii (V) (vulnerable)
 Russet-backed oropendola, Psarocolius angustifrons Green oropendola, Psarocolius viridis Crested oropendola, Psarocolius decumanus Olive oropendola, Psarocolius bifasciatus Solitary black cacique, Cacicus solitarius Golden-winged cacique, Cacicus chrysopterus Selva cacique, Cacicus koepckeae Yellow-rumped cacique, Cacicus cela Band-tailed cacique, Cacicus latirostris Red-rumped cacique, Cacicus haemorrhous Casqued cacique, Cacicus oseryi Orange-backed troupial, Icterus croconotus Campo troupial, Icterus jamacaii (E)
 Epaulet oriole, Icterus cayanensis Variable oriole, Icterus pyrrhopterus Baltimore oriole, Icterus galbula (V)
 Yellow oriole, Icterus nigrogularis Screaming cowbird, Molothrus rufoaxillaris Giant cowbird, Molothrus oryzivorus Shiny cowbird, Molothrus bonariensis Carib grackle, Quiscalus lugubris Velvet-fronted grackle, Lampropsar tanagrinus Oriole blackbird, Gymnomystax mexicanus Golden-tufted grackle, Macroagelaius imthurni Scarlet-headed blackbird, Amblyramphus holosericeus Forbes's blackbird, Anumara forbesi (E) (endangered)
 Chopi blackbird, Gnorimopsar chopi Grayish baywing, Agelaioides badius Pale baywing, Agelaioides fringillarius (E)
 Unicolored blackbird, Agelasticus cyanopus Yellow-winged blackbird, Agelasticus thilius Chestnut-capped blackbird, Chrysomus ruficapillus Yellow-hooded blackbird, Chrysomus icterocephalus Saffron-cowled blackbird, Xanthopsar flavus (vulnerable)
 Yellow-rumped marshbird, Pseudoleistes guirahuro Brown-and-yellow marshbird, Pseudoleistes virescensWood-warblers

Order: PasseriformesFamily: Parulidae

The wood-warblers are a group of small, often colorful, passerine birds restricted to the New World. Most are arboreal, but some are terrestrial. Most members of this family are insectivores.

 Northern waterthrush, Parkesia noveboracensis (V)
 Louisiana waterthrush, Parkesia motacilla (V)
 Black-and-white warbler, Mniotilta varia (V)
 Prothonotary warbler, Protonotaria citrea (H)
 Tennessee warbler, Leiothlypis peregrina (V)
 Connecticut warbler, Oporornis agilis (V)
 Masked yellowthroat, Geothlypis aequinoctialis American redstart, Setophaga ruticilla (V)
 Cerulean warbler, Setophaga cerulea (V)
 Tropical parula, Setophaga pitiayumi Blackburnian warbler, Setophaga fusca Yellow warbler, Setophaga petechia Blackpoll warbler, Setophaga striata Black-throated green warbler, Setophaga virens (V)
 White-striped warbler, Myiothlypis leucophrys (E)
 Flavescent warbler, Myiothlypis flaveolus White-browed warbler, Myiothlypis leucoblephara Buff-rumped warbler, Myiothlypis fulvicauda Riverbank warbler, Myiothlypis rivularis Two-banded warbler, Myiothlypis bivittatus Golden-crowned warbler, Basileuterus culicivorus Canada warbler, Cardellina canadensis (H)
 Slate-throated redstart, Myioborus miniatus Tepui redstart, Myioborus castaneocapillusMitrospingids
Order: PasseriformesFamily: Mitrospingidae

Until 2017 the four species in this family were included in the family Thraupidae, the "true" tanagers.

 Olive-backed tanager, Mitrospingus oleagineus Red-billed pied tanager, Lamprospiza melanoleuca Olive-green tanager, Orthogonys chloricterus (E)

Cardinal grosbeaks
Order: PasseriformesFamily: Cardinalidae

The cardinals are a family of robust, seed-eating birds with strong bills. They are typically associated with open woodland. The sexes usually have distinct plumages.

 Hepatic tanager, Piranga flava Summer tanager, Piranga rubra Scarlet tanager, Piranga olivacea White-winged tanager, Piranga leucoptera Red-crowned ant-tanager, Habia rubica Black-backed grosbeak, Pheucticus aureoventris (V)
 Rose-breasted grosbeak, Pheucticus ludovicianus (V)
 Rose-breasted chat, Granatellus pelzelni Yellow-green grosbeak, Caryothraustes canadensis Red-and-black grosbeak, Periporphyrus erythromelas Blackish-blue seedeater, Amaurospiza moesta Glaucous-blue grosbeak, Cyanoloxia glaucocaerulea Amazonian grosbeak, Cyanoloxia rothschildii Ultramarine grosbeak, Cyanoloxia brissonii Dickcissel, Spiza americana (V)

Tanagers
Order: PasseriformesFamily: Thraupidae

The tanagers are a large group of small to medium-sized passerine birds restricted to the New World, mainly in the tropics. Many species are brightly colored. As a family they are omnivorous, but individual species specialize in eating fruits, seeds, insects, or other types of food. Most have short, rounded wings.

 Blue-backed tanager, Cyanicterus cyanicterus Hooded tanager, Nemosia pileata Cherry-throated tanager, Nemosia rourei (E) (critically endangered)
 Scarlet-throated tanager, Compsothraupis loricata (E)
 Brown tanager, Orchesticus abeillei (E) (near-threatened)
 Yellow-shouldered grosbeak, Parkerthraustes humeralis Green honeycreeper, Chlorophanes spiza Guira tanager, Hemithraupis guira Rufous-headed tanager, Hemithraupis ruficapilla (E)
 Yellow-backed tanager, Hemithraupis flavicollis Bicolored conebill, Conirostrum bicolor Pearly-breasted conebill, Conirostrum margaritae Chestnut-vented conebill, Conirostrum speciosum Stripe-tailed yellow-finch, Sicalis citrina Orange-fronted yellow-finch, Sicalis columbiana Saffron finch, Sicalis flaveola Grassland yellow-finch, Sicalis luteola Mourning sierra finch, Rhopospina fruticeti (V)
 Blue finch, Rhopospina caerulescens Paramo seedeater, Catamenia homochroa Scaled flowerpiercer, Diglossa duidae Greater flowerpiercer, Diglossa major Uniform finch, Haplospiza unicolor Blue-black grassquit, Volatinia jacarina Black-and-white tanager, Conothraupis speculigera (near-threatened)
 Cone-billed tanager, Conothraupis mesoleuca (E) (endangered)
 Flame-crested tanager, Loriotus cristatus Yellow-crested tanager, Loriotus rufiventer White-shouldered tanager, Loriotus luctuosus Fulvous-crested tanager, Tachyphonus surinamus Ruby-crowned tanager, Tachyphonus coronatus White-lined tanager, Tachyphonus rufus Red-shouldered tanager, Tachyphonus phoenicius Gray-headed tanager, Eucometis penicillata Black-goggled tanager, Trichothraupis melanops Pileated finch, Coryphospingus pileatus Red-crested finch, Coryphospingus cucullatus Masked crimson tanager, Ramphocelus nigrogularis Silver-beaked tanager, Ramphocelus carbo Brazilian tanager, Ramphocelus bresilius (E)
 Fulvous shrike-tanager, Lanio fulvus White-winged shrike-tanager, Lanio versicolor Coal-crested finch, Charitospiza eucosma (near-threatened)
 Short-billed honeycreeper, Cyanerpes nitidus Purple honeycreeper, Cyanerpes caeruleus Red-legged honeycreeper, Cyanerpes cyaneus Swallow tanager, Tersina viridis White-bellied dacnis, Dacnis albiventris Black-faced dacnis, Dacnis lineata Yellow-bellied dacnis, Dacnis flaviventer Black-legged dacnis, Dacnis nigripes (E) (near-threatened)
 Blue dacnis, Dacnis cayana Lesson's seedeater, Sporophila bouvronides Lined seedeater, Sporophila lineola White-bellied seedeater, Sporophila leucoptera Chestnut-bellied seedeater, Sporophila castaneiventris Ruddy-breasted seedeater, Sporophila minuta Black-and-tawny seedeater, Sporophila nigrorufa Copper seedeater, Sporophila bouvreuil Pearly-bellied seedeater, Sporophila pileata Tawny-bellied seedeater, Sporophila hypoxantha Dark-throated seedeater, Sporophila ruficollis (near-threatened)
 Marsh seedeater, Sporophila palustris Rufous-rumped seedeater, Sporophila hypochroma (near-threatened)
 Chestnut seedeater, Sporophila cinnamomea Black-bellied seedeater, Sporophila melanogaster (E) (near-threatened)
 Chestnut-bellied seed-finch, Sporophila angolensis Great-billed seed-finch, Sporophila maximiliani Large-billed seed-finch, Sporophila crassirostris Gray seedeater, Sporophila intermedia Wing-barred seedeater, Sporophila americana White-naped seedeater, Sporophila fringilloides Black-and-white seedeater, Sporophila luctuosa (V)
 Yellow-bellied seedeater, Sporophila nigricollis Dubois's seedeater, Sporophila ardesiaca (E)
 Double-collared seedeater, Sporophila caerulescens Slate-colored seedeater, Sporophila schistacea Temminck's seedeater, Sporophila falcirostris (vulnerable)
 Buffy-fronted seedeater, Sporophila frontalis (E) (vulnerable)
 Plumbeous seedeater, Sporophila plumbea Tropeiro seedeater, Sporophila beltoni (E)
 Rusty-collared seedeater, Sporophila collaris White-throated seedeater, Sporophila albogularis (E)
 Many-colored chaco finch, Saltatricula multicolor (V)
 Black-throated saltator, Saltatricula atricollis Buff-throated saltator, Saltator maximus Olive-gray saltator, Saltator olivascens Bluish-gray saltator, Saltator coerulescens Green-winged saltator, Saltator similis Thick-billed saltator, Saltator maxillosus Golden-billed saltator, Saltator aurantiirostris Slate-colored grosbeak, Saltator grossus Black-throated grosbeak, Saltator fuliginosus Black-masked finch, Coryphaspiza melanotis (vulnerable)
 Great Pampa-finch, Embernagra platensis Pale-throated Pampa-finch, Embernagra longicauda (E)
 Wedge-tailed grass-finch, Emberizoides herbicola Lesser grass-finch, Emberizoides ypiranganus Bay-chested warbling finch, Castanozoster thoracicus (E)
 Black-and-rufous warbling finch, Poospiza nigrorufa Orange-headed tanager, Thlypopsis sordida Chestnut-headed tanager, Thlypopsis pyrrhocoma Buff-throated warbling finch, Microspingus lateralis (E)
 Gray-throated warbling finch, Microspingus cabanisi Black-capped warbling finch, Microspingus melanoleucus Cinereous warbling finch, Microspingus cinereus (E)
 White-rumped tanager, Cypsnagra hirundinacea Long-tailed reed finch, Donacospiza albifrons Bananaquit, Coereba flaveola Dull-colored grassquit, Asemospiza obscura Sooty grassquit, Asemospiza fuliginosa White-banded tanager, Neothraupis fasciata (near-threatened)
 Diuca finch, Diuca diuca (V)
 Yellow cardinal, Gubernatrix cristata (endangered)
 Red-crested cardinal, Paroaria coronata Red-cowled cardinal, Paroaria dominicana (E)
 Red-capped cardinal, Paroaria gularis Crimson-fronted cardinal, Paroaria baeri (E)
 Yellow-billed cardinal, Paroaria capitata Diademed tanager, Stephanophorus diadematus Black-faced tanager, Schistochlamys melanopis Cinnamon tanager, Schistochlamys ruficapillus (E)
 Magpie tanager, Cissopis leverianus Fawn-breasted tanager, Pipraeidea melanonota Blue-and-yellow tanager, Rauenia bonariensis Black-headed tanager, Stilpnia cyanoptera Black-backed tanager, Stilpnia peruviana (E) (vulnerable)
 Chestnut-backed tanager, Stilpnia preciosa Burnished-buff tanager, Stilpnia cayana Masked tanager, Stilpnia nigrocincta Blue-necked tanager, Stilpnia cyanicollis Turquoise tanager, Tangara mexicana Paradise tanager, Tangara chilensis Opal-rumped tanager, Tangara velia Opal-crowned tanager, Tangara callophrys Green-headed tanager, Tangara seledon Seven-colored tanager, Tangara fastuosa (E) (vulnerable)
 Red-necked tanager, Tangara cyanocephala (E)
 Brassy-breasted tanager, Tangara desmaresti (E)
 Gilt-edged tanager, Tangara cyanoventris (E)
 Bay-headed tanager, Tangara gyrola Green-and-gold tanager, Tangara schrankii Blue-gray tanager, Thraupis episcopus Sayaca tanager, Thraupis sayaca Azure-shouldered tanager, Thraupis cyanoptera (E) (near-threatened)
 Golden-chevroned tanager, Thraupis ornata (E)
 Palm tanager, Thraupis palmarum Dotted tanager, Ixothraupis varia Speckled tanager, Ixothraupis guttata Yellow-bellied tanager, Ixothraupis xanthogastra Spotted tanager, Ixothraupis punctata''

Notes

References

See also
 Wildlife of Brazil
 Lists of birds by region
 List of amphibians of Brazil
 List of reptiles of Brazil
 List of mammals of Brazil
 List of macaws
 List of amazon parrots
 List of Aratinga parakeets
WikiAves - website dedicated to the Brazilian community of birdwatchers

External links
National and state bird lists of Brazil - World Institute for Conservation and Environment

Brazil
 
Birds
Brazil